

164001–164100 

|-bgcolor=#E9E9E9
| 164001 ||  || — || October 22, 2003 || Kitt Peak || Spacewatch || WIT || align=right | 2.0 km || 
|-id=002 bgcolor=#E9E9E9
| 164002 ||  || — || October 20, 2003 || Socorro || LINEAR || — || align=right | 2.0 km || 
|-id=003 bgcolor=#E9E9E9
| 164003 ||  || — || October 21, 2003 || Kitt Peak || Spacewatch || MIS || align=right | 4.2 km || 
|-id=004 bgcolor=#E9E9E9
| 164004 ||  || — || October 21, 2003 || Kitt Peak || Spacewatch || NEM || align=right | 3.2 km || 
|-id=005 bgcolor=#E9E9E9
| 164005 ||  || — || October 21, 2003 || Kitt Peak || Spacewatch || — || align=right | 1.9 km || 
|-id=006 bgcolor=#E9E9E9
| 164006 Thierry ||  ||  || October 21, 2003 || Saint-Sulpice || B. Christophe || — || align=right | 1.3 km || 
|-id=007 bgcolor=#E9E9E9
| 164007 ||  || — || October 22, 2003 || Socorro || LINEAR || WIT || align=right | 1.9 km || 
|-id=008 bgcolor=#E9E9E9
| 164008 ||  || — || October 22, 2003 || Kitt Peak || Spacewatch || — || align=right | 2.2 km || 
|-id=009 bgcolor=#E9E9E9
| 164009 ||  || — || October 22, 2003 || Kitt Peak || Spacewatch || — || align=right | 3.9 km || 
|-id=010 bgcolor=#E9E9E9
| 164010 ||  || — || October 20, 2003 || Kitt Peak || Spacewatch || — || align=right | 4.1 km || 
|-id=011 bgcolor=#E9E9E9
| 164011 ||  || — || October 20, 2003 || Palomar || NEAT || — || align=right | 4.1 km || 
|-id=012 bgcolor=#E9E9E9
| 164012 ||  || — || October 21, 2003 || Kitt Peak || Spacewatch || HEN || align=right | 1.7 km || 
|-id=013 bgcolor=#E9E9E9
| 164013 ||  || — || October 21, 2003 || Anderson Mesa || LONEOS || — || align=right | 2.4 km || 
|-id=014 bgcolor=#E9E9E9
| 164014 ||  || — || October 21, 2003 || Socorro || LINEAR || — || align=right | 3.7 km || 
|-id=015 bgcolor=#E9E9E9
| 164015 ||  || — || October 21, 2003 || Kitt Peak || Spacewatch || — || align=right | 3.4 km || 
|-id=016 bgcolor=#E9E9E9
| 164016 ||  || — || October 21, 2003 || Kitt Peak || Spacewatch || ADE || align=right | 4.7 km || 
|-id=017 bgcolor=#E9E9E9
| 164017 ||  || — || October 22, 2003 || Socorro || LINEAR || — || align=right | 5.1 km || 
|-id=018 bgcolor=#E9E9E9
| 164018 ||  || — || October 22, 2003 || Socorro || LINEAR || INO || align=right | 2.4 km || 
|-id=019 bgcolor=#E9E9E9
| 164019 ||  || — || October 22, 2003 || Kitt Peak || Spacewatch || — || align=right | 2.9 km || 
|-id=020 bgcolor=#E9E9E9
| 164020 ||  || — || October 21, 2003 || Socorro || LINEAR || — || align=right | 4.1 km || 
|-id=021 bgcolor=#E9E9E9
| 164021 ||  || — || October 21, 2003 || Anderson Mesa || LONEOS || — || align=right | 4.3 km || 
|-id=022 bgcolor=#E9E9E9
| 164022 ||  || — || October 22, 2003 || Socorro || LINEAR || WIT || align=right | 1.7 km || 
|-id=023 bgcolor=#E9E9E9
| 164023 ||  || — || October 22, 2003 || Socorro || LINEAR || — || align=right | 5.5 km || 
|-id=024 bgcolor=#E9E9E9
| 164024 ||  || — || October 22, 2003 || Socorro || LINEAR || — || align=right | 2.5 km || 
|-id=025 bgcolor=#E9E9E9
| 164025 ||  || — || October 22, 2003 || Kitt Peak || Spacewatch || HOF || align=right | 4.7 km || 
|-id=026 bgcolor=#E9E9E9
| 164026 ||  || — || October 23, 2003 || Kitt Peak || Spacewatch || — || align=right | 3.6 km || 
|-id=027 bgcolor=#E9E9E9
| 164027 ||  || — || October 24, 2003 || Socorro || LINEAR || — || align=right | 2.2 km || 
|-id=028 bgcolor=#E9E9E9
| 164028 ||  || — || October 24, 2003 || Kitt Peak || Spacewatch || — || align=right | 4.5 km || 
|-id=029 bgcolor=#E9E9E9
| 164029 ||  || — || October 24, 2003 || Socorro || LINEAR || — || align=right | 4.2 km || 
|-id=030 bgcolor=#E9E9E9
| 164030 ||  || — || October 24, 2003 || Socorro || LINEAR || — || align=right | 2.3 km || 
|-id=031 bgcolor=#E9E9E9
| 164031 ||  || — || October 24, 2003 || Socorro || LINEAR || — || align=right | 2.3 km || 
|-id=032 bgcolor=#E9E9E9
| 164032 ||  || — || October 25, 2003 || Socorro || LINEAR || — || align=right | 1.8 km || 
|-id=033 bgcolor=#E9E9E9
| 164033 ||  || — || October 25, 2003 || Socorro || LINEAR || — || align=right | 1.9 km || 
|-id=034 bgcolor=#E9E9E9
| 164034 ||  || — || October 26, 2003 || Kitt Peak || Spacewatch || — || align=right | 1.7 km || 
|-id=035 bgcolor=#E9E9E9
| 164035 ||  || — || October 24, 2003 || Kitt Peak || Spacewatch || — || align=right | 1.2 km || 
|-id=036 bgcolor=#E9E9E9
| 164036 ||  || — || October 25, 2003 || Socorro || LINEAR || — || align=right | 2.2 km || 
|-id=037 bgcolor=#E9E9E9
| 164037 ||  || — || October 25, 2003 || Socorro || LINEAR || — || align=right | 4.4 km || 
|-id=038 bgcolor=#E9E9E9
| 164038 ||  || — || October 27, 2003 || Socorro || LINEAR || — || align=right | 4.3 km || 
|-id=039 bgcolor=#E9E9E9
| 164039 ||  || — || October 27, 2003 || Socorro || LINEAR || — || align=right | 1.7 km || 
|-id=040 bgcolor=#E9E9E9
| 164040 ||  || — || October 27, 2003 || Kitt Peak || Spacewatch || — || align=right | 2.3 km || 
|-id=041 bgcolor=#E9E9E9
| 164041 ||  || — || October 28, 2003 || Socorro || LINEAR || — || align=right | 3.4 km || 
|-id=042 bgcolor=#E9E9E9
| 164042 ||  || — || October 29, 2003 || Catalina || CSS || — || align=right | 4.0 km || 
|-id=043 bgcolor=#E9E9E9
| 164043 ||  || — || October 25, 2003 || Socorro || LINEAR || — || align=right | 2.0 km || 
|-id=044 bgcolor=#E9E9E9
| 164044 ||  || — || October 27, 2003 || Kitt Peak || Spacewatch || — || align=right | 3.4 km || 
|-id=045 bgcolor=#E9E9E9
| 164045 ||  || — || October 29, 2003 || Anderson Mesa || LONEOS || WIT || align=right | 1.9 km || 
|-id=046 bgcolor=#E9E9E9
| 164046 ||  || — || October 30, 2003 || Socorro || LINEAR || EUN || align=right | 3.5 km || 
|-id=047 bgcolor=#E9E9E9
| 164047 ||  || — || October 16, 2003 || Kitt Peak || Spacewatch || — || align=right | 2.4 km || 
|-id=048 bgcolor=#E9E9E9
| 164048 ||  || — || October 16, 2003 || Kitt Peak || Spacewatch || — || align=right | 1.8 km || 
|-id=049 bgcolor=#E9E9E9
| 164049 ||  || — || October 17, 2003 || Kitt Peak || Spacewatch || — || align=right | 1.6 km || 
|-id=050 bgcolor=#E9E9E9
| 164050 ||  || — || October 18, 2003 || Kitt Peak || Spacewatch || — || align=right | 2.6 km || 
|-id=051 bgcolor=#E9E9E9
| 164051 ||  || — || October 19, 2003 || Kitt Peak || Spacewatch || — || align=right | 1.9 km || 
|-id=052 bgcolor=#E9E9E9
| 164052 ||  || — || November 15, 2003 || Kitt Peak || Spacewatch || — || align=right | 3.0 km || 
|-id=053 bgcolor=#E9E9E9
| 164053 ||  || — || November 15, 2003 || Kitt Peak || Spacewatch || — || align=right | 2.6 km || 
|-id=054 bgcolor=#E9E9E9
| 164054 ||  || — || November 14, 2003 || Palomar || NEAT || — || align=right | 3.5 km || 
|-id=055 bgcolor=#E9E9E9
| 164055 ||  || — || November 15, 2003 || Palomar || NEAT || — || align=right | 3.1 km || 
|-id=056 bgcolor=#E9E9E9
| 164056 ||  || — || November 15, 2003 || Kitt Peak || Spacewatch || — || align=right | 3.7 km || 
|-id=057 bgcolor=#E9E9E9
| 164057 ||  || — || November 18, 2003 || Kitt Peak || Spacewatch || — || align=right | 3.6 km || 
|-id=058 bgcolor=#E9E9E9
| 164058 ||  || — || November 18, 2003 || Palomar || NEAT || — || align=right | 3.0 km || 
|-id=059 bgcolor=#E9E9E9
| 164059 ||  || — || November 16, 2003 || Catalina || CSS || EUN || align=right | 3.5 km || 
|-id=060 bgcolor=#d6d6d6
| 164060 ||  || — || November 18, 2003 || Palomar || NEAT || — || align=right | 3.1 km || 
|-id=061 bgcolor=#E9E9E9
| 164061 ||  || — || November 18, 2003 || Kitt Peak || Spacewatch || — || align=right | 3.3 km || 
|-id=062 bgcolor=#E9E9E9
| 164062 ||  || — || November 19, 2003 || Socorro || LINEAR || — || align=right | 3.0 km || 
|-id=063 bgcolor=#E9E9E9
| 164063 ||  || — || November 19, 2003 || Kitt Peak || Spacewatch || — || align=right | 1.9 km || 
|-id=064 bgcolor=#E9E9E9
| 164064 ||  || — || November 18, 2003 || Palomar || NEAT || MRX || align=right | 1.8 km || 
|-id=065 bgcolor=#E9E9E9
| 164065 ||  || — || November 19, 2003 || Socorro || LINEAR || WIT || align=right | 1.7 km || 
|-id=066 bgcolor=#E9E9E9
| 164066 ||  || — || November 20, 2003 || Socorro || LINEAR || — || align=right | 3.6 km || 
|-id=067 bgcolor=#E9E9E9
| 164067 ||  || — || November 19, 2003 || Kitt Peak || Spacewatch || — || align=right | 3.2 km || 
|-id=068 bgcolor=#E9E9E9
| 164068 ||  || — || November 19, 2003 || Socorro || LINEAR || JUN || align=right | 2.3 km || 
|-id=069 bgcolor=#E9E9E9
| 164069 ||  || — || November 19, 2003 || Kitt Peak || Spacewatch || AGN || align=right | 2.0 km || 
|-id=070 bgcolor=#E9E9E9
| 164070 ||  || — || November 20, 2003 || Palomar || NEAT || MAR || align=right | 3.6 km || 
|-id=071 bgcolor=#E9E9E9
| 164071 ||  || — || November 20, 2003 || Catalina || CSS || — || align=right | 2.4 km || 
|-id=072 bgcolor=#E9E9E9
| 164072 ||  || — || November 18, 2003 || Palomar || NEAT || ADE || align=right | 5.3 km || 
|-id=073 bgcolor=#E9E9E9
| 164073 ||  || — || November 19, 2003 || Catalina || CSS || — || align=right | 4.5 km || 
|-id=074 bgcolor=#E9E9E9
| 164074 ||  || — || November 21, 2003 || Palomar || NEAT || MAR || align=right | 2.1 km || 
|-id=075 bgcolor=#E9E9E9
| 164075 ||  || — || November 22, 2003 || Socorro || LINEAR || — || align=right | 1.6 km || 
|-id=076 bgcolor=#E9E9E9
| 164076 ||  || — || November 16, 2003 || Catalina || CSS || PAD || align=right | 4.3 km || 
|-id=077 bgcolor=#E9E9E9
| 164077 ||  || — || November 18, 2003 || Kitt Peak || Spacewatch || AGN || align=right | 2.2 km || 
|-id=078 bgcolor=#E9E9E9
| 164078 ||  || — || November 19, 2003 || Anderson Mesa || LONEOS || — || align=right | 4.0 km || 
|-id=079 bgcolor=#E9E9E9
| 164079 ||  || — || November 19, 2003 || Anderson Mesa || LONEOS || HEN || align=right | 3.7 km || 
|-id=080 bgcolor=#E9E9E9
| 164080 ||  || — || November 19, 2003 || Anderson Mesa || LONEOS || AST || align=right | 3.5 km || 
|-id=081 bgcolor=#E9E9E9
| 164081 ||  || — || November 19, 2003 || Anderson Mesa || LONEOS || — || align=right | 3.0 km || 
|-id=082 bgcolor=#E9E9E9
| 164082 ||  || — || November 21, 2003 || Socorro || LINEAR || — || align=right | 4.7 km || 
|-id=083 bgcolor=#E9E9E9
| 164083 ||  || — || November 21, 2003 || Socorro || LINEAR || — || align=right | 1.7 km || 
|-id=084 bgcolor=#E9E9E9
| 164084 ||  || — || November 20, 2003 || Socorro || LINEAR || EUN || align=right | 3.2 km || 
|-id=085 bgcolor=#d6d6d6
| 164085 ||  || — || November 20, 2003 || Kitt Peak || Spacewatch || TEL || align=right | 2.5 km || 
|-id=086 bgcolor=#E9E9E9
| 164086 ||  || — || November 20, 2003 || Socorro || LINEAR || — || align=right | 1.8 km || 
|-id=087 bgcolor=#d6d6d6
| 164087 ||  || — || November 20, 2003 || Socorro || LINEAR || EOS || align=right | 3.6 km || 
|-id=088 bgcolor=#E9E9E9
| 164088 ||  || — || November 20, 2003 || Socorro || LINEAR || — || align=right | 3.7 km || 
|-id=089 bgcolor=#E9E9E9
| 164089 ||  || — || November 20, 2003 || Socorro || LINEAR || — || align=right | 1.6 km || 
|-id=090 bgcolor=#E9E9E9
| 164090 ||  || — || November 19, 2003 || Kitt Peak || Spacewatch || — || align=right | 3.4 km || 
|-id=091 bgcolor=#d6d6d6
| 164091 ||  || — || November 21, 2003 || Socorro || LINEAR || — || align=right | 5.1 km || 
|-id=092 bgcolor=#E9E9E9
| 164092 ||  || — || November 21, 2003 || Socorro || LINEAR || — || align=right | 5.6 km || 
|-id=093 bgcolor=#E9E9E9
| 164093 ||  || — || November 21, 2003 || Socorro || LINEAR || CLO || align=right | 3.3 km || 
|-id=094 bgcolor=#fefefe
| 164094 ||  || — || November 21, 2003 || Palomar || NEAT || NYS || align=right | 1.1 km || 
|-id=095 bgcolor=#d6d6d6
| 164095 ||  || — || November 21, 2003 || Socorro || LINEAR || KOR || align=right | 1.9 km || 
|-id=096 bgcolor=#E9E9E9
| 164096 ||  || — || November 29, 2003 || Socorro || LINEAR || — || align=right | 3.3 km || 
|-id=097 bgcolor=#E9E9E9
| 164097 ||  || — || November 29, 2003 || Kitt Peak || Spacewatch || — || align=right | 2.8 km || 
|-id=098 bgcolor=#E9E9E9
| 164098 ||  || — || November 30, 2003 || Socorro || LINEAR || — || align=right | 3.0 km || 
|-id=099 bgcolor=#d6d6d6
| 164099 ||  || — || November 30, 2003 || Kitt Peak || Spacewatch || — || align=right | 3.6 km || 
|-id=100 bgcolor=#d6d6d6
| 164100 ||  || — || November 18, 2003 || Palomar || NEAT || KOR || align=right | 2.1 km || 
|}

164101–164200 

|-bgcolor=#E9E9E9
| 164101 ||  || — || November 19, 2003 || Kitt Peak || Spacewatch || — || align=right | 2.6 km || 
|-id=102 bgcolor=#d6d6d6
| 164102 ||  || — || November 19, 2003 || Kitt Peak || Spacewatch || — || align=right | 3.8 km || 
|-id=103 bgcolor=#E9E9E9
| 164103 ||  || — || December 1, 2003 || Kitt Peak || Spacewatch || — || align=right | 3.2 km || 
|-id=104 bgcolor=#d6d6d6
| 164104 ||  || — || December 4, 2003 || Socorro || LINEAR || BRA || align=right | 5.1 km || 
|-id=105 bgcolor=#E9E9E9
| 164105 ||  || — || December 4, 2003 || Socorro || LINEAR || — || align=right | 3.4 km || 
|-id=106 bgcolor=#E9E9E9
| 164106 ||  || — || December 11, 2003 || Socorro || LINEAR || BRU || align=right | 7.0 km || 
|-id=107 bgcolor=#E9E9E9
| 164107 ||  || — || December 13, 2003 || Socorro || LINEAR || JUN || align=right | 1.8 km || 
|-id=108 bgcolor=#E9E9E9
| 164108 ||  || — || December 13, 2003 || Palomar || NEAT || EUN || align=right | 1.9 km || 
|-id=109 bgcolor=#d6d6d6
| 164109 ||  || — || December 14, 2003 || Kitt Peak || Spacewatch || HYG || align=right | 4.4 km || 
|-id=110 bgcolor=#E9E9E9
| 164110 ||  || — || December 14, 2003 || Palomar || NEAT || — || align=right | 6.5 km || 
|-id=111 bgcolor=#E9E9E9
| 164111 ||  || — || December 15, 2003 || Kitt Peak || Spacewatch || — || align=right | 3.9 km || 
|-id=112 bgcolor=#E9E9E9
| 164112 ||  || — || December 14, 2003 || Kitt Peak || Spacewatch || — || align=right | 1.7 km || 
|-id=113 bgcolor=#E9E9E9
| 164113 ||  || — || December 15, 2003 || Socorro || LINEAR || — || align=right | 3.4 km || 
|-id=114 bgcolor=#E9E9E9
| 164114 ||  || — || December 1, 2003 || Socorro || LINEAR || AEO || align=right | 4.1 km || 
|-id=115 bgcolor=#d6d6d6
| 164115 ||  || — || December 1, 2003 || Kitt Peak || Spacewatch || KOR || align=right | 1.9 km || 
|-id=116 bgcolor=#E9E9E9
| 164116 ||  || — || December 1, 2003 || Kitt Peak || Spacewatch || HEN || align=right | 1.6 km || 
|-id=117 bgcolor=#d6d6d6
| 164117 ||  || — || December 3, 2003 || Socorro || LINEAR || — || align=right | 3.7 km || 
|-id=118 bgcolor=#E9E9E9
| 164118 ||  || — || December 4, 2003 || Socorro || LINEAR || — || align=right | 5.0 km || 
|-id=119 bgcolor=#E9E9E9
| 164119 ||  || — || December 14, 2003 || Kitt Peak || Spacewatch || — || align=right | 2.7 km || 
|-id=120 bgcolor=#FFC2E0
| 164120 || 2003 YK || — || December 17, 2003 || Socorro || LINEAR || APO || align=right data-sort-value="0.54" | 540 m || 
|-id=121 bgcolor=#FFC2E0
| 164121 ||  || — || December 18, 2003 || Catalina || CSS || APO +1kmPHAmoon || align=right | 1.7 km || 
|-id=122 bgcolor=#E9E9E9
| 164122 ||  || — || December 16, 2003 || Catalina || CSS || — || align=right | 2.8 km || 
|-id=123 bgcolor=#E9E9E9
| 164123 ||  || — || December 16, 2003 || Catalina || CSS || — || align=right | 4.0 km || 
|-id=124 bgcolor=#d6d6d6
| 164124 ||  || — || December 17, 2003 || Socorro || LINEAR || — || align=right | 4.4 km || 
|-id=125 bgcolor=#E9E9E9
| 164125 ||  || — || December 17, 2003 || Socorro || LINEAR || MIT || align=right | 4.9 km || 
|-id=126 bgcolor=#d6d6d6
| 164126 ||  || — || December 17, 2003 || Catalina || CSS || — || align=right | 3.5 km || 
|-id=127 bgcolor=#d6d6d6
| 164127 ||  || — || December 17, 2003 || Socorro || LINEAR || — || align=right | 6.3 km || 
|-id=128 bgcolor=#d6d6d6
| 164128 ||  || — || December 17, 2003 || Anderson Mesa || LONEOS || — || align=right | 6.5 km || 
|-id=129 bgcolor=#E9E9E9
| 164129 ||  || — || December 17, 2003 || Kitt Peak || Spacewatch || — || align=right | 2.6 km || 
|-id=130 bgcolor=#d6d6d6
| 164130 Jonckheere ||  ||  || December 18, 2003 || Uccle || T. Pauwels, P. De Cat || KOR || align=right | 2.4 km || 
|-id=131 bgcolor=#d6d6d6
| 164131 ||  || — || December 19, 2003 || Socorro || LINEAR || THM || align=right | 5.0 km || 
|-id=132 bgcolor=#E9E9E9
| 164132 ||  || — || December 17, 2003 || Socorro || LINEAR || — || align=right | 4.5 km || 
|-id=133 bgcolor=#E9E9E9
| 164133 ||  || — || December 18, 2003 || Socorro || LINEAR || — || align=right | 2.8 km || 
|-id=134 bgcolor=#d6d6d6
| 164134 ||  || — || December 18, 2003 || Socorro || LINEAR || NAE || align=right | 7.2 km || 
|-id=135 bgcolor=#d6d6d6
| 164135 ||  || — || December 19, 2003 || Socorro || LINEAR || THM || align=right | 5.0 km || 
|-id=136 bgcolor=#E9E9E9
| 164136 ||  || — || December 21, 2003 || Socorro || LINEAR || PAD || align=right | 4.0 km || 
|-id=137 bgcolor=#d6d6d6
| 164137 ||  || — || December 18, 2003 || Socorro || LINEAR || URS || align=right | 8.0 km || 
|-id=138 bgcolor=#d6d6d6
| 164138 ||  || — || December 18, 2003 || Socorro || LINEAR || — || align=right | 4.2 km || 
|-id=139 bgcolor=#E9E9E9
| 164139 ||  || — || December 19, 2003 || Socorro || LINEAR || — || align=right | 1.9 km || 
|-id=140 bgcolor=#E9E9E9
| 164140 ||  || — || December 19, 2003 || Socorro || LINEAR || DOR || align=right | 4.7 km || 
|-id=141 bgcolor=#d6d6d6
| 164141 ||  || — || December 19, 2003 || Socorro || LINEAR || — || align=right | 4.9 km || 
|-id=142 bgcolor=#E9E9E9
| 164142 ||  || — || December 20, 2003 || Socorro || LINEAR || — || align=right | 5.6 km || 
|-id=143 bgcolor=#E9E9E9
| 164143 ||  || — || December 20, 2003 || Socorro || LINEAR || — || align=right | 3.6 km || 
|-id=144 bgcolor=#d6d6d6
| 164144 ||  || — || December 19, 2003 || Socorro || LINEAR || 628 || align=right | 4.0 km || 
|-id=145 bgcolor=#d6d6d6
| 164145 ||  || — || December 21, 2003 || Socorro || LINEAR || TEL || align=right | 2.6 km || 
|-id=146 bgcolor=#d6d6d6
| 164146 ||  || — || December 22, 2003 || Socorro || LINEAR || — || align=right | 3.0 km || 
|-id=147 bgcolor=#E9E9E9
| 164147 ||  || — || December 22, 2003 || Palomar || NEAT || — || align=right | 3.2 km || 
|-id=148 bgcolor=#fefefe
| 164148 ||  || — || December 22, 2003 || Kitt Peak || Spacewatch || NYS || align=right | 1.2 km || 
|-id=149 bgcolor=#d6d6d6
| 164149 ||  || — || December 25, 2003 || Haleakala || NEAT || EOS || align=right | 4.0 km || 
|-id=150 bgcolor=#d6d6d6
| 164150 ||  || — || December 27, 2003 || Socorro || LINEAR || HYG || align=right | 5.6 km || 
|-id=151 bgcolor=#E9E9E9
| 164151 ||  || — || December 27, 2003 || Socorro || LINEAR || — || align=right | 4.6 km || 
|-id=152 bgcolor=#d6d6d6
| 164152 ||  || — || December 27, 2003 || Socorro || LINEAR || EOS || align=right | 3.7 km || 
|-id=153 bgcolor=#d6d6d6
| 164153 ||  || — || December 27, 2003 || Socorro || LINEAR || — || align=right | 5.6 km || 
|-id=154 bgcolor=#E9E9E9
| 164154 ||  || — || December 27, 2003 || Socorro || LINEAR || — || align=right | 4.3 km || 
|-id=155 bgcolor=#E9E9E9
| 164155 ||  || — || December 28, 2003 || Socorro || LINEAR || ADE || align=right | 5.1 km || 
|-id=156 bgcolor=#d6d6d6
| 164156 ||  || — || December 28, 2003 || Socorro || LINEAR || — || align=right | 5.8 km || 
|-id=157 bgcolor=#d6d6d6
| 164157 ||  || — || December 28, 2003 || Socorro || LINEAR || EOS || align=right | 3.3 km || 
|-id=158 bgcolor=#d6d6d6
| 164158 ||  || — || December 28, 2003 || Socorro || LINEAR || — || align=right | 5.2 km || 
|-id=159 bgcolor=#d6d6d6
| 164159 ||  || — || December 29, 2003 || Socorro || LINEAR || — || align=right | 6.6 km || 
|-id=160 bgcolor=#E9E9E9
| 164160 ||  || — || December 29, 2003 || Socorro || LINEAR || EUN || align=right | 2.5 km || 
|-id=161 bgcolor=#E9E9E9
| 164161 ||  || — || December 30, 2003 || Socorro || LINEAR || MAR || align=right | 3.3 km || 
|-id=162 bgcolor=#E9E9E9
| 164162 ||  || — || December 30, 2003 || Socorro || LINEAR || — || align=right | 3.4 km || 
|-id=163 bgcolor=#d6d6d6
| 164163 ||  || — || December 26, 2003 || Haleakala || NEAT || YAK || align=right | 6.3 km || 
|-id=164 bgcolor=#d6d6d6
| 164164 ||  || — || December 17, 2003 || Kitt Peak || Spacewatch || — || align=right | 3.3 km || 
|-id=165 bgcolor=#d6d6d6
| 164165 ||  || — || January 13, 2004 || Anderson Mesa || LONEOS || TEL || align=right | 2.4 km || 
|-id=166 bgcolor=#d6d6d6
| 164166 ||  || — || January 13, 2004 || Anderson Mesa || LONEOS || EOS || align=right | 4.3 km || 
|-id=167 bgcolor=#d6d6d6
| 164167 ||  || — || January 13, 2004 || Palomar || NEAT || TEL || align=right | 2.5 km || 
|-id=168 bgcolor=#d6d6d6
| 164168 ||  || — || January 14, 2004 || Palomar || NEAT || — || align=right | 6.3 km || 
|-id=169 bgcolor=#d6d6d6
| 164169 ||  || — || January 12, 2004 || Palomar || NEAT || — || align=right | 6.2 km || 
|-id=170 bgcolor=#E9E9E9
| 164170 ||  || — || January 12, 2004 || Palomar || NEAT || — || align=right | 4.4 km || 
|-id=171 bgcolor=#E9E9E9
| 164171 ||  || — || January 13, 2004 || Anderson Mesa || LONEOS || — || align=right | 5.1 km || 
|-id=172 bgcolor=#d6d6d6
| 164172 ||  || — || January 16, 2004 || Kitt Peak || Spacewatch || TEL || align=right | 2.5 km || 
|-id=173 bgcolor=#d6d6d6
| 164173 ||  || — || January 17, 2004 || Kitt Peak || Spacewatch || — || align=right | 4.0 km || 
|-id=174 bgcolor=#d6d6d6
| 164174 ||  || — || January 18, 2004 || Kitt Peak || Spacewatch || — || align=right | 3.6 km || 
|-id=175 bgcolor=#d6d6d6
| 164175 ||  || — || January 19, 2004 || Kitt Peak || Spacewatch || HYG || align=right | 5.5 km || 
|-id=176 bgcolor=#d6d6d6
| 164176 ||  || — || January 21, 2004 || Socorro || LINEAR || — || align=right | 4.2 km || 
|-id=177 bgcolor=#E9E9E9
| 164177 ||  || — || January 21, 2004 || Socorro || LINEAR || fast? || align=right | 4.1 km || 
|-id=178 bgcolor=#d6d6d6
| 164178 ||  || — || January 21, 2004 || Socorro || LINEAR || — || align=right | 4.5 km || 
|-id=179 bgcolor=#d6d6d6
| 164179 ||  || — || January 21, 2004 || Socorro || LINEAR || — || align=right | 3.9 km || 
|-id=180 bgcolor=#E9E9E9
| 164180 ||  || — || January 21, 2004 || Socorro || LINEAR || GEF || align=right | 2.5 km || 
|-id=181 bgcolor=#E9E9E9
| 164181 ||  || — || January 21, 2004 || Socorro || LINEAR || — || align=right | 3.5 km || 
|-id=182 bgcolor=#d6d6d6
| 164182 ||  || — || January 21, 2004 || Socorro || LINEAR || — || align=right | 3.5 km || 
|-id=183 bgcolor=#d6d6d6
| 164183 ||  || — || January 23, 2004 || Socorro || LINEAR || — || align=right | 5.1 km || 
|-id=184 bgcolor=#FFC2E0
| 164184 ||  || — || January 27, 2004 || Socorro || LINEAR || APO || align=right data-sort-value="0.48" | 480 m || 
|-id=185 bgcolor=#E9E9E9
| 164185 ||  || — || January 20, 2004 || Kingsnake || J. V. McClusky || — || align=right | 4.6 km || 
|-id=186 bgcolor=#d6d6d6
| 164186 ||  || — || January 22, 2004 || Socorro || LINEAR || — || align=right | 4.7 km || 
|-id=187 bgcolor=#d6d6d6
| 164187 ||  || — || January 22, 2004 || Socorro || LINEAR || — || align=right | 6.0 km || 
|-id=188 bgcolor=#d6d6d6
| 164188 ||  || — || January 24, 2004 || Socorro || LINEAR || — || align=right | 4.2 km || 
|-id=189 bgcolor=#d6d6d6
| 164189 ||  || — || January 25, 2004 || Haleakala || NEAT || — || align=right | 7.7 km || 
|-id=190 bgcolor=#d6d6d6
| 164190 ||  || — || January 24, 2004 || Socorro || LINEAR || THM || align=right | 4.9 km || 
|-id=191 bgcolor=#d6d6d6
| 164191 ||  || — || January 28, 2004 || Haleakala || NEAT || — || align=right | 6.0 km || 
|-id=192 bgcolor=#d6d6d6
| 164192 ||  || — || January 25, 2004 || Haleakala || NEAT || BRA || align=right | 3.4 km || 
|-id=193 bgcolor=#d6d6d6
| 164193 ||  || — || January 22, 2004 || Socorro || LINEAR || — || align=right | 6.6 km || 
|-id=194 bgcolor=#E9E9E9
| 164194 ||  || — || January 18, 2004 || Palomar || NEAT || — || align=right | 5.1 km || 
|-id=195 bgcolor=#d6d6d6
| 164195 ||  || — || February 11, 2004 || Palomar || NEAT || THM || align=right | 3.6 km || 
|-id=196 bgcolor=#E9E9E9
| 164196 ||  || — || February 14, 2004 || Socorro || LINEAR || PAL || align=right | 3.7 km || 
|-id=197 bgcolor=#E9E9E9
| 164197 ||  || — || February 11, 2004 || Palomar || NEAT || MRX || align=right | 1.7 km || 
|-id=198 bgcolor=#d6d6d6
| 164198 ||  || — || February 11, 2004 || Palomar || NEAT || — || align=right | 5.9 km || 
|-id=199 bgcolor=#d6d6d6
| 164199 ||  || — || February 11, 2004 || Palomar || NEAT || — || align=right | 5.8 km || 
|-id=200 bgcolor=#d6d6d6
| 164200 ||  || — || February 17, 2004 || Kitt Peak || Spacewatch || LIX || align=right | 6.9 km || 
|}

164201–164300 

|-bgcolor=#FFC2E0
| 164201 || 2004 EC || — || March 10, 2004 || Socorro || LINEAR || APO +1km || align=right | 2.6 km || 
|-id=202 bgcolor=#FFC2E0
| 164202 || 2004 EW || — || March 13, 2004 || Catalina || CSS || ATEPHA || align=right data-sort-value="0.25" | 250 m || 
|-id=203 bgcolor=#E9E9E9
| 164203 ||  || — || March 15, 2004 || Socorro || LINEAR || HNS || align=right | 2.4 km || 
|-id=204 bgcolor=#d6d6d6
| 164204 ||  || — || March 15, 2004 || Kitt Peak || Spacewatch || — || align=right | 4.2 km || 
|-id=205 bgcolor=#d6d6d6
| 164205 ||  || — || March 14, 2004 || Kitt Peak || Spacewatch || THM || align=right | 3.4 km || 
|-id=206 bgcolor=#FFC2E0
| 164206 ||  || — || March 27, 2004 || Socorro || LINEAR || APO +1km || align=right | 1.1 km || 
|-id=207 bgcolor=#FFC2E0
| 164207 ||  || — || April 13, 2004 || Socorro || LINEAR || APOPHA || align=right data-sort-value="0.16" | 160 m || 
|-id=208 bgcolor=#C2FFFF
| 164208 ||  || — || April 20, 2004 || Socorro || LINEAR || L4 || align=right | 16 km || 
|-id=209 bgcolor=#fefefe
| 164209 ||  || — || April 27, 2004 || Socorro || LINEAR || H || align=right | 1.1 km || 
|-id=210 bgcolor=#C2FFFF
| 164210 ||  || — || May 9, 2004 || Kitt Peak || Spacewatch || L4 || align=right | 15 km || 
|-id=211 bgcolor=#FFC2E0
| 164211 ||  || — || May 15, 2004 || Socorro || LINEAR || APOPHA || align=right data-sort-value="0.47" | 470 m || 
|-id=212 bgcolor=#C2FFFF
| 164212 ||  || — || May 13, 2004 || Kitt Peak || Spacewatch || L4 || align=right | 15 km || 
|-id=213 bgcolor=#fefefe
| 164213 ||  || — || June 11, 2004 || Socorro || LINEAR || H || align=right | 1.3 km || 
|-id=214 bgcolor=#FFC2E0
| 164214 ||  || — || June 14, 2004 || Socorro || LINEAR || AMO || align=right data-sort-value="0.56" | 560 m || 
|-id=215 bgcolor=#FFC2E0
| 164215 Doloreshill ||  ||  || June 25, 2004 || Catalina || CSS || AMOcritical || align=right data-sort-value="0.36" | 360 m || 
|-id=216 bgcolor=#FFC2E0
| 164216 ||  || — || July 27, 2004 || Socorro || LINEAR || APO +1kmPHA || align=right | 1.3 km || 
|-id=217 bgcolor=#FFC2E0
| 164217 ||  || — || August 11, 2004 || Siding Spring || SSS || AMO +1km || align=right | 1.3 km || 
|-id=218 bgcolor=#fefefe
| 164218 ||  || — || August 10, 2004 || Socorro || LINEAR || PHO || align=right | 1.9 km || 
|-id=219 bgcolor=#fefefe
| 164219 ||  || — || August 21, 2004 || Reedy Creek || J. Broughton || H || align=right data-sort-value="0.85" | 850 m || 
|-id=220 bgcolor=#FA8072
| 164220 ||  || — || August 25, 2004 || Socorro || LINEAR || — || align=right | 1.5 km || 
|-id=221 bgcolor=#FFC2E0
| 164221 ||  || — || August 26, 2004 || Anderson Mesa || LONEOS || AMO || align=right data-sort-value="0.33" | 330 m || 
|-id=222 bgcolor=#FFC2E0
| 164222 ||  || — || September 7, 2004 || Socorro || LINEAR || APO || align=right data-sort-value="0.26" | 260 m || 
|-id=223 bgcolor=#fefefe
| 164223 ||  || — || September 8, 2004 || Socorro || LINEAR || — || align=right | 1.7 km || 
|-id=224 bgcolor=#fefefe
| 164224 ||  || — || September 10, 2004 || Socorro || LINEAR || — || align=right | 1.1 km || 
|-id=225 bgcolor=#fefefe
| 164225 ||  || — || September 10, 2004 || Socorro || LINEAR || — || align=right | 1.7 km || 
|-id=226 bgcolor=#fefefe
| 164226 ||  || — || September 10, 2004 || Socorro || LINEAR || — || align=right | 1.4 km || 
|-id=227 bgcolor=#fefefe
| 164227 ||  || — || September 9, 2004 || Kitt Peak || Spacewatch || FLO || align=right data-sort-value="0.88" | 880 m || 
|-id=228 bgcolor=#fefefe
| 164228 ||  || — || September 9, 2004 || Kitt Peak || Spacewatch || — || align=right | 1.4 km || 
|-id=229 bgcolor=#fefefe
| 164229 ||  || — || September 13, 2004 || Socorro || LINEAR || — || align=right | 1.1 km || 
|-id=230 bgcolor=#fefefe
| 164230 ||  || — || September 15, 2004 || Kitt Peak || Spacewatch || FLO || align=right | 1.0 km || 
|-id=231 bgcolor=#fefefe
| 164231 ||  || — || September 15, 2004 || Anderson Mesa || LONEOS || — || align=right | 1.6 km || 
|-id=232 bgcolor=#fefefe
| 164232 ||  || — || September 17, 2004 || Kitt Peak || Spacewatch || — || align=right | 1.4 km || 
|-id=233 bgcolor=#fefefe
| 164233 ||  || — || September 22, 2004 || Goodricke-Pigott || R. A. Tucker || — || align=right data-sort-value="0.95" | 950 m || 
|-id=234 bgcolor=#fefefe
| 164234 ||  || — || October 4, 2004 || Kitt Peak || Spacewatch || FLO || align=right data-sort-value="0.96" | 960 m || 
|-id=235 bgcolor=#fefefe
| 164235 ||  || — || October 9, 2004 || Kitt Peak || Spacewatch || — || align=right | 1.5 km || 
|-id=236 bgcolor=#fefefe
| 164236 ||  || — || October 11, 2004 || Kitt Peak || Spacewatch || — || align=right | 1.2 km || 
|-id=237 bgcolor=#fefefe
| 164237 ||  || — || October 11, 2004 || Kitt Peak || Spacewatch || — || align=right | 1.6 km || 
|-id=238 bgcolor=#fefefe
| 164238 ||  || — || October 4, 2004 || Kitt Peak || Spacewatch || — || align=right data-sort-value="0.97" | 970 m || 
|-id=239 bgcolor=#fefefe
| 164239 ||  || — || October 4, 2004 || Kitt Peak || Spacewatch || — || align=right data-sort-value="0.79" | 790 m || 
|-id=240 bgcolor=#fefefe
| 164240 ||  || — || October 4, 2004 || Kitt Peak || Spacewatch || NYS || align=right | 2.3 km || 
|-id=241 bgcolor=#fefefe
| 164241 ||  || — || October 4, 2004 || Kitt Peak || Spacewatch || — || align=right data-sort-value="0.93" | 930 m || 
|-id=242 bgcolor=#fefefe
| 164242 ||  || — || October 4, 2004 || Kitt Peak || Spacewatch || — || align=right | 1.1 km || 
|-id=243 bgcolor=#fefefe
| 164243 ||  || — || October 6, 2004 || Kitt Peak || Spacewatch || — || align=right | 1.4 km || 
|-id=244 bgcolor=#fefefe
| 164244 ||  || — || October 6, 2004 || Palomar || NEAT || — || align=right | 1.0 km || 
|-id=245 bgcolor=#fefefe
| 164245 ||  || — || October 7, 2004 || Kitt Peak || Spacewatch || — || align=right | 1.1 km || 
|-id=246 bgcolor=#fefefe
| 164246 ||  || — || October 7, 2004 || Palomar || NEAT || FLO || align=right data-sort-value="0.88" | 880 m || 
|-id=247 bgcolor=#fefefe
| 164247 ||  || — || October 7, 2004 || Anderson Mesa || LONEOS || FLO || align=right | 2.2 km || 
|-id=248 bgcolor=#fefefe
| 164248 ||  || — || October 7, 2004 || Palomar || NEAT || FLO || align=right data-sort-value="0.95" | 950 m || 
|-id=249 bgcolor=#fefefe
| 164249 ||  || — || October 9, 2004 || Anderson Mesa || LONEOS || — || align=right | 1.3 km || 
|-id=250 bgcolor=#fefefe
| 164250 ||  || — || October 6, 2004 || Kitt Peak || Spacewatch || — || align=right | 1.6 km || 
|-id=251 bgcolor=#fefefe
| 164251 ||  || — || October 7, 2004 || Socorro || LINEAR || — || align=right | 1.3 km || 
|-id=252 bgcolor=#fefefe
| 164252 ||  || — || October 15, 2004 || Anderson Mesa || LONEOS || — || align=right | 1.0 km || 
|-id=253 bgcolor=#fefefe
| 164253 ||  || — || October 8, 2004 || Kitt Peak || Spacewatch || — || align=right | 1.3 km || 
|-id=254 bgcolor=#fefefe
| 164254 ||  || — || October 9, 2004 || Kitt Peak || Spacewatch || — || align=right data-sort-value="0.76" | 760 m || 
|-id=255 bgcolor=#fefefe
| 164255 ||  || — || October 9, 2004 || Socorro || LINEAR || — || align=right | 1.1 km || 
|-id=256 bgcolor=#fefefe
| 164256 ||  || — || October 9, 2004 || Socorro || LINEAR || — || align=right | 1.1 km || 
|-id=257 bgcolor=#fefefe
| 164257 ||  || — || October 9, 2004 || Kitt Peak || Spacewatch || — || align=right | 1.0 km || 
|-id=258 bgcolor=#fefefe
| 164258 ||  || — || October 9, 2004 || Kitt Peak || Spacewatch || — || align=right | 1.2 km || 
|-id=259 bgcolor=#fefefe
| 164259 ||  || — || October 7, 2004 || Palomar || NEAT || FLO || align=right | 1.1 km || 
|-id=260 bgcolor=#fefefe
| 164260 ||  || — || October 11, 2004 || Kitt Peak || Spacewatch || — || align=right data-sort-value="0.94" | 940 m || 
|-id=261 bgcolor=#fefefe
| 164261 ||  || — || October 9, 2004 || Socorro || LINEAR || FLO || align=right | 1.2 km || 
|-id=262 bgcolor=#fefefe
| 164262 ||  || — || October 9, 2004 || Kitt Peak || Spacewatch || — || align=right | 1.4 km || 
|-id=263 bgcolor=#fefefe
| 164263 ||  || — || October 16, 2004 || Socorro || LINEAR || PHO || align=right | 4.6 km || 
|-id=264 bgcolor=#fefefe
| 164264 ||  || — || October 21, 2004 || Socorro || LINEAR || — || align=right | 1.1 km || 
|-id=265 bgcolor=#fefefe
| 164265 || 2004 VO || — || November 2, 2004 || Desert Eagle || W. K. Y. Yeung || — || align=right | 2.3 km || 
|-id=266 bgcolor=#fefefe
| 164266 ||  || — || November 3, 2004 || Anderson Mesa || LONEOS || FLO || align=right data-sort-value="0.73" | 730 m || 
|-id=267 bgcolor=#fefefe
| 164267 ||  || — || November 4, 2004 || Catalina || CSS || V || align=right | 1.1 km || 
|-id=268 bgcolor=#fefefe
| 164268 Hajmási ||  ||  || November 11, 2004 || Piszkéstető || K. Sárneczky || — || align=right data-sort-value="0.93" | 930 m || 
|-id=269 bgcolor=#FA8072
| 164269 ||  || — || November 19, 2004 || Socorro || LINEAR || — || align=right | 1.4 km || 
|-id=270 bgcolor=#fefefe
| 164270 ||  || — || December 1, 2004 || Catalina || CSS || — || align=right | 1.2 km || 
|-id=271 bgcolor=#fefefe
| 164271 ||  || — || December 2, 2004 || Socorro || LINEAR || — || align=right | 1.6 km || 
|-id=272 bgcolor=#fefefe
| 164272 ||  || — || December 2, 2004 || Palomar || NEAT || — || align=right | 1.4 km || 
|-id=273 bgcolor=#FA8072
| 164273 ||  || — || December 8, 2004 || Socorro || LINEAR || PHO || align=right | 2.4 km || 
|-id=274 bgcolor=#E9E9E9
| 164274 ||  || — || December 3, 2004 || Kitt Peak || Spacewatch || — || align=right | 1.7 km || 
|-id=275 bgcolor=#fefefe
| 164275 ||  || — || December 8, 2004 || Socorro || LINEAR || MAS || align=right | 1.3 km || 
|-id=276 bgcolor=#fefefe
| 164276 ||  || — || December 9, 2004 || Catalina || CSS || — || align=right | 1.2 km || 
|-id=277 bgcolor=#fefefe
| 164277 ||  || — || December 10, 2004 || Campo Imperatore || CINEOS || V || align=right | 1.1 km || 
|-id=278 bgcolor=#fefefe
| 164278 ||  || — || December 10, 2004 || Socorro || LINEAR || — || align=right | 1.6 km || 
|-id=279 bgcolor=#fefefe
| 164279 ||  || — || December 9, 2004 || Catalina || CSS || V || align=right | 1.2 km || 
|-id=280 bgcolor=#fefefe
| 164280 ||  || — || December 10, 2004 || Kitt Peak || Spacewatch || — || align=right data-sort-value="0.83" | 830 m || 
|-id=281 bgcolor=#fefefe
| 164281 ||  || — || December 11, 2004 || Črni Vrh || Črni Vrh || — || align=right | 1.5 km || 
|-id=282 bgcolor=#fefefe
| 164282 ||  || — || December 13, 2004 || Anderson Mesa || LONEOS || — || align=right | 1.5 km || 
|-id=283 bgcolor=#E9E9E9
| 164283 ||  || — || December 9, 2004 || Socorro || LINEAR || — || align=right | 2.0 km || 
|-id=284 bgcolor=#E9E9E9
| 164284 ||  || — || December 9, 2004 || Kitt Peak || Spacewatch || — || align=right | 2.1 km || 
|-id=285 bgcolor=#fefefe
| 164285 ||  || — || December 11, 2004 || Kitt Peak || Spacewatch || — || align=right | 1.0 km || 
|-id=286 bgcolor=#fefefe
| 164286 ||  || — || December 13, 2004 || Kitt Peak || Spacewatch || SUL || align=right | 3.2 km || 
|-id=287 bgcolor=#fefefe
| 164287 ||  || — || December 9, 2004 || Catalina || CSS || — || align=right data-sort-value="0.88" | 880 m || 
|-id=288 bgcolor=#fefefe
| 164288 ||  || — || December 11, 2004 || Socorro || LINEAR || — || align=right | 1.1 km || 
|-id=289 bgcolor=#d6d6d6
| 164289 ||  || — || December 11, 2004 || Kitt Peak || Spacewatch || — || align=right | 7.1 km || 
|-id=290 bgcolor=#fefefe
| 164290 ||  || — || December 11, 2004 || Socorro || LINEAR || — || align=right | 1.3 km || 
|-id=291 bgcolor=#fefefe
| 164291 ||  || — || December 11, 2004 || Socorro || LINEAR || V || align=right | 1.3 km || 
|-id=292 bgcolor=#fefefe
| 164292 ||  || — || December 14, 2004 || Catalina || CSS || — || align=right | 1.2 km || 
|-id=293 bgcolor=#E9E9E9
| 164293 ||  || — || December 10, 2004 || Socorro || LINEAR || HNS || align=right | 2.3 km || 
|-id=294 bgcolor=#FFC2E0
| 164294 ||  || — || December 13, 2004 || Mauna Kea || D. J. Tholen || ATIcritical || align=right data-sort-value="0.30" | 300 m || 
|-id=295 bgcolor=#d6d6d6
| 164295 ||  || — || December 9, 2004 || Catalina || CSS || Tj (2.71) || align=right | 11 km || 
|-id=296 bgcolor=#fefefe
| 164296 ||  || — || December 11, 2004 || Kitt Peak || Spacewatch || FLO || align=right | 1.3 km || 
|-id=297 bgcolor=#fefefe
| 164297 ||  || — || December 13, 2004 || Kitt Peak || Spacewatch || — || align=right | 1.3 km || 
|-id=298 bgcolor=#fefefe
| 164298 ||  || — || December 15, 2004 || Socorro || LINEAR || NYS || align=right | 1.3 km || 
|-id=299 bgcolor=#E9E9E9
| 164299 ||  || — || December 15, 2004 || Socorro || LINEAR || — || align=right | 2.1 km || 
|-id=300 bgcolor=#E9E9E9
| 164300 ||  || — || December 18, 2004 || Mount Lemmon || Mount Lemmon Survey || HEN || align=right | 1.7 km || 
|}

164301–164400 

|-bgcolor=#fefefe
| 164301 ||  || — || December 18, 2004 || Mount Lemmon || Mount Lemmon Survey || MAS || align=right | 1.1 km || 
|-id=302 bgcolor=#fefefe
| 164302 ||  || — || December 18, 2004 || Mount Lemmon || Mount Lemmon Survey || — || align=right | 1.3 km || 
|-id=303 bgcolor=#fefefe
| 164303 ||  || — || December 18, 2004 || Mount Lemmon || Mount Lemmon Survey || NYS || align=right | 1.1 km || 
|-id=304 bgcolor=#fefefe
| 164304 ||  || — || January 6, 2005 || Catalina || CSS || — || align=right | 1.7 km || 
|-id=305 bgcolor=#fefefe
| 164305 ||  || — || January 6, 2005 || Catalina || CSS || SUL || align=right | 3.7 km || 
|-id=306 bgcolor=#fefefe
| 164306 ||  || — || January 8, 2005 || RAS || A. Lowe || V || align=right | 1.1 km || 
|-id=307 bgcolor=#E9E9E9
| 164307 ||  || — || January 1, 2005 || Catalina || CSS || — || align=right | 4.2 km || 
|-id=308 bgcolor=#fefefe
| 164308 ||  || — || January 6, 2005 || Catalina || CSS || — || align=right | 1.8 km || 
|-id=309 bgcolor=#fefefe
| 164309 ||  || — || January 6, 2005 || Socorro || LINEAR || — || align=right | 1.5 km || 
|-id=310 bgcolor=#fefefe
| 164310 ||  || — || January 6, 2005 || Socorro || LINEAR || — || align=right | 1.3 km || 
|-id=311 bgcolor=#fefefe
| 164311 ||  || — || January 6, 2005 || Socorro || LINEAR || — || align=right | 1.6 km || 
|-id=312 bgcolor=#fefefe
| 164312 ||  || — || January 6, 2005 || Socorro || LINEAR || NYS || align=right | 1.3 km || 
|-id=313 bgcolor=#fefefe
| 164313 ||  || — || January 7, 2005 || Socorro || LINEAR || NYS || align=right | 1.1 km || 
|-id=314 bgcolor=#fefefe
| 164314 ||  || — || January 11, 2005 || Socorro || LINEAR || — || align=right | 1.3 km || 
|-id=315 bgcolor=#E9E9E9
| 164315 ||  || — || January 8, 2005 || Campo Imperatore || CINEOS || — || align=right | 3.6 km || 
|-id=316 bgcolor=#fefefe
| 164316 ||  || — || January 11, 2005 || Socorro || LINEAR || — || align=right | 1.1 km || 
|-id=317 bgcolor=#fefefe
| 164317 ||  || — || January 13, 2005 || Socorro || LINEAR || — || align=right | 1.9 km || 
|-id=318 bgcolor=#E9E9E9
| 164318 ||  || — || January 13, 2005 || Socorro || LINEAR || PAD || align=right | 2.6 km || 
|-id=319 bgcolor=#E9E9E9
| 164319 ||  || — || January 15, 2005 || Socorro || LINEAR || — || align=right | 2.6 km || 
|-id=320 bgcolor=#E9E9E9
| 164320 ||  || — || January 15, 2005 || Socorro || LINEAR || — || align=right | 2.3 km || 
|-id=321 bgcolor=#fefefe
| 164321 ||  || — || January 15, 2005 || Socorro || LINEAR || MAS || align=right | 1.0 km || 
|-id=322 bgcolor=#E9E9E9
| 164322 ||  || — || January 15, 2005 || Kitt Peak || Spacewatch || — || align=right | 1.6 km || 
|-id=323 bgcolor=#fefefe
| 164323 ||  || — || January 11, 2005 || Socorro || LINEAR || — || align=right | 1.6 km || 
|-id=324 bgcolor=#fefefe
| 164324 ||  || — || January 13, 2005 || Kitt Peak || Spacewatch || MAS || align=right | 1.1 km || 
|-id=325 bgcolor=#E9E9E9
| 164325 ||  || — || January 13, 2005 || Kitt Peak || Spacewatch || — || align=right | 3.7 km || 
|-id=326 bgcolor=#E9E9E9
| 164326 ||  || — || January 13, 2005 || Socorro || LINEAR || — || align=right | 2.7 km || 
|-id=327 bgcolor=#E9E9E9
| 164327 ||  || — || January 13, 2005 || Socorro || LINEAR || — || align=right | 4.8 km || 
|-id=328 bgcolor=#E9E9E9
| 164328 ||  || — || January 13, 2005 || Kitt Peak || Spacewatch || — || align=right | 3.8 km || 
|-id=329 bgcolor=#fefefe
| 164329 ||  || — || January 15, 2005 || Anderson Mesa || LONEOS || V || align=right | 1.2 km || 
|-id=330 bgcolor=#fefefe
| 164330 ||  || — || January 15, 2005 || Socorro || LINEAR || NYS || align=right | 1.2 km || 
|-id=331 bgcolor=#E9E9E9
| 164331 ||  || — || January 15, 2005 || Kitt Peak || Spacewatch || — || align=right | 3.1 km || 
|-id=332 bgcolor=#fefefe
| 164332 ||  || — || January 15, 2005 || Kitt Peak || Spacewatch || NYS || align=right | 1.1 km || 
|-id=333 bgcolor=#fefefe
| 164333 || 2005 BF || — || January 16, 2005 || Desert Eagle || W. K. Y. Yeung || — || align=right | 1.2 km || 
|-id=334 bgcolor=#E9E9E9
| 164334 ||  || — || January 18, 2005 || RAS || U. Wolff || — || align=right | 4.2 km || 
|-id=335 bgcolor=#fefefe
| 164335 ||  || — || January 16, 2005 || Socorro || LINEAR || PHO || align=right | 1.9 km || 
|-id=336 bgcolor=#E9E9E9
| 164336 ||  || — || January 16, 2005 || Kitt Peak || Spacewatch || — || align=right | 1.6 km || 
|-id=337 bgcolor=#fefefe
| 164337 ||  || — || January 17, 2005 || Socorro || LINEAR || MAS || align=right | 1.3 km || 
|-id=338 bgcolor=#fefefe
| 164338 ||  || — || January 16, 2005 || Socorro || LINEAR || — || align=right | 2.1 km || 
|-id=339 bgcolor=#fefefe
| 164339 ||  || — || January 16, 2005 || Socorro || LINEAR || NYS || align=right | 1.2 km || 
|-id=340 bgcolor=#E9E9E9
| 164340 ||  || — || January 16, 2005 || Mauna Kea || C. Veillet || — || align=right | 1.7 km || 
|-id=341 bgcolor=#FFC2E0
| 164341 || 2005 CO || — || February 2, 2005 || Socorro || LINEAR || AMOcritical || align=right data-sort-value="0.28" | 280 m || 
|-id=342 bgcolor=#FFC2E0
| 164342 || 2005 CP || — || February 2, 2005 || Socorro || LINEAR || APOcritical || align=right data-sort-value="0.25" | 250 m || 
|-id=343 bgcolor=#d6d6d6
| 164343 ||  || — || February 2, 2005 || Kitt Peak || Spacewatch || — || align=right | 5.5 km || 
|-id=344 bgcolor=#E9E9E9
| 164344 ||  || — || February 2, 2005 || Kitt Peak || Spacewatch || — || align=right | 4.8 km || 
|-id=345 bgcolor=#fefefe
| 164345 ||  || — || February 2, 2005 || Socorro || LINEAR || NYS || align=right | 1.0 km || 
|-id=346 bgcolor=#d6d6d6
| 164346 ||  || — || February 1, 2005 || Kitt Peak || Spacewatch || — || align=right | 4.8 km || 
|-id=347 bgcolor=#E9E9E9
| 164347 ||  || — || February 2, 2005 || Catalina || CSS || — || align=right | 3.5 km || 
|-id=348 bgcolor=#E9E9E9
| 164348 ||  || — || February 2, 2005 || Catalina || CSS || — || align=right | 3.6 km || 
|-id=349 bgcolor=#E9E9E9
| 164349 ||  || — || February 2, 2005 || Catalina || CSS || — || align=right | 2.5 km || 
|-id=350 bgcolor=#d6d6d6
| 164350 ||  || — || February 3, 2005 || Socorro || LINEAR || — || align=right | 5.1 km || 
|-id=351 bgcolor=#fefefe
| 164351 ||  || — || February 4, 2005 || Mount Lemmon || Mount Lemmon Survey || NYS || align=right | 1.1 km || 
|-id=352 bgcolor=#E9E9E9
| 164352 ||  || — || February 2, 2005 || Catalina || CSS || — || align=right | 3.0 km || 
|-id=353 bgcolor=#fefefe
| 164353 ||  || — || February 2, 2005 || Socorro || LINEAR || — || align=right | 2.1 km || 
|-id=354 bgcolor=#E9E9E9
| 164354 ||  || — || February 9, 2005 || Anderson Mesa || LONEOS || AER || align=right | 1.9 km || 
|-id=355 bgcolor=#E9E9E9
| 164355 ||  || — || February 9, 2005 || Socorro || LINEAR || WIT || align=right | 1.7 km || 
|-id=356 bgcolor=#d6d6d6
| 164356 ||  || — || February 1, 2005 || Kitt Peak || Spacewatch || K-2 || align=right | 2.0 km || 
|-id=357 bgcolor=#E9E9E9
| 164357 ||  || — || February 2, 2005 || Kitt Peak || Spacewatch || — || align=right | 2.3 km || 
|-id=358 bgcolor=#d6d6d6
| 164358 || 2005 DB || — || February 16, 2005 || Gnosca || S. Sposetti || — || align=right | 4.3 km || 
|-id=359 bgcolor=#d6d6d6
| 164359 ||  || — || March 2, 2005 || Great Shefford || P. Birtwhistle || — || align=right | 4.7 km || 
|-id=360 bgcolor=#d6d6d6
| 164360 ||  || — || March 1, 2005 || Gnosca || S. Sposetti || — || align=right | 3.1 km || 
|-id=361 bgcolor=#E9E9E9
| 164361 ||  || — || March 2, 2005 || Catalina || CSS || — || align=right | 3.0 km || 
|-id=362 bgcolor=#E9E9E9
| 164362 ||  || — || March 3, 2005 || Kitt Peak || Spacewatch || HEN || align=right | 1.6 km || 
|-id=363 bgcolor=#d6d6d6
| 164363 ||  || — || March 3, 2005 || Kitt Peak || Spacewatch || KOR || align=right | 3.0 km || 
|-id=364 bgcolor=#d6d6d6
| 164364 ||  || — || March 3, 2005 || Catalina || CSS || — || align=right | 5.3 km || 
|-id=365 bgcolor=#d6d6d6
| 164365 ||  || — || March 4, 2005 || Catalina || CSS || HYG || align=right | 5.3 km || 
|-id=366 bgcolor=#d6d6d6
| 164366 ||  || — || March 1, 2005 || Socorro || LINEAR || — || align=right | 6.5 km || 
|-id=367 bgcolor=#E9E9E9
| 164367 ||  || — || March 3, 2005 || Catalina || CSS || — || align=right | 3.1 km || 
|-id=368 bgcolor=#E9E9E9
| 164368 ||  || — || March 3, 2005 || Catalina || CSS || — || align=right | 4.0 km || 
|-id=369 bgcolor=#d6d6d6
| 164369 ||  || — || March 3, 2005 || Catalina || CSS || — || align=right | 3.9 km || 
|-id=370 bgcolor=#E9E9E9
| 164370 ||  || — || March 3, 2005 || Catalina || CSS || — || align=right | 3.4 km || 
|-id=371 bgcolor=#d6d6d6
| 164371 ||  || — || March 4, 2005 || Mount Lemmon || Mount Lemmon Survey || — || align=right | 4.6 km || 
|-id=372 bgcolor=#d6d6d6
| 164372 ||  || — || March 4, 2005 || Mount Lemmon || Mount Lemmon Survey || KOR || align=right | 2.8 km || 
|-id=373 bgcolor=#d6d6d6
| 164373 ||  || — || March 7, 2005 || Socorro || LINEAR || — || align=right | 7.7 km || 
|-id=374 bgcolor=#fefefe
| 164374 ||  || — || March 3, 2005 || Catalina || CSS || — || align=right | 1.4 km || 
|-id=375 bgcolor=#d6d6d6
| 164375 ||  || — || March 4, 2005 || Catalina || CSS || — || align=right | 6.8 km || 
|-id=376 bgcolor=#d6d6d6
| 164376 ||  || — || March 4, 2005 || Catalina || CSS || — || align=right | 6.0 km || 
|-id=377 bgcolor=#d6d6d6
| 164377 ||  || — || March 7, 2005 || Socorro || LINEAR || EOS || align=right | 4.3 km || 
|-id=378 bgcolor=#d6d6d6
| 164378 ||  || — || March 8, 2005 || Mount Lemmon || Mount Lemmon Survey || KOR || align=right | 2.5 km || 
|-id=379 bgcolor=#E9E9E9
| 164379 ||  || — || March 9, 2005 || Mount Lemmon || Mount Lemmon Survey || AGN || align=right | 1.9 km || 
|-id=380 bgcolor=#d6d6d6
| 164380 ||  || — || March 10, 2005 || Kitt Peak || Spacewatch || KOR || align=right | 2.9 km || 
|-id=381 bgcolor=#E9E9E9
| 164381 ||  || — || March 11, 2005 || Mount Lemmon || Mount Lemmon Survey || — || align=right | 2.4 km || 
|-id=382 bgcolor=#d6d6d6
| 164382 ||  || — || March 9, 2005 || Socorro || LINEAR || — || align=right | 7.1 km || 
|-id=383 bgcolor=#fefefe
| 164383 ||  || — || March 13, 2005 || Kitt Peak || Spacewatch || — || align=right | 1.4 km || 
|-id=384 bgcolor=#d6d6d6
| 164384 ||  || — || March 4, 2005 || Kitt Peak || Spacewatch || — || align=right | 4.9 km || 
|-id=385 bgcolor=#d6d6d6
| 164385 ||  || — || March 9, 2005 || Mount Lemmon || Mount Lemmon Survey || — || align=right | 5.4 km || 
|-id=386 bgcolor=#d6d6d6
| 164386 ||  || — || March 11, 2005 || Kitt Peak || Spacewatch || — || align=right | 3.7 km || 
|-id=387 bgcolor=#d6d6d6
| 164387 ||  || — || March 13, 2005 || Kitt Peak || Spacewatch || — || align=right | 5.6 km || 
|-id=388 bgcolor=#E9E9E9
| 164388 ||  || — || March 3, 2005 || Kitt Peak || Spacewatch || WIT || align=right | 1.5 km || 
|-id=389 bgcolor=#d6d6d6
| 164389 ||  || — || March 9, 2005 || Mount Lemmon || Mount Lemmon Survey || — || align=right | 5.1 km || 
|-id=390 bgcolor=#d6d6d6
| 164390 ||  || — || March 9, 2005 || Catalina || CSS || TEL || align=right | 2.6 km || 
|-id=391 bgcolor=#d6d6d6
| 164391 ||  || — || March 13, 2005 || Mount Lemmon || Mount Lemmon Survey || THM || align=right | 4.6 km || 
|-id=392 bgcolor=#fefefe
| 164392 ||  || — || March 30, 2005 || Catalina || CSS || PHO || align=right | 1.5 km || 
|-id=393 bgcolor=#d6d6d6
| 164393 ||  || — || April 1, 2005 || Catalina || CSS || — || align=right | 7.6 km || 
|-id=394 bgcolor=#E9E9E9
| 164394 ||  || — || April 1, 2005 || Catalina || CSS || — || align=right | 3.3 km || 
|-id=395 bgcolor=#E9E9E9
| 164395 ||  || — || April 2, 2005 || Anderson Mesa || LONEOS || — || align=right | 3.0 km || 
|-id=396 bgcolor=#d6d6d6
| 164396 ||  || — || April 4, 2005 || Catalina || CSS || — || align=right | 4.2 km || 
|-id=397 bgcolor=#d6d6d6
| 164397 ||  || — || April 4, 2005 || Mount Lemmon || Mount Lemmon Survey || EOS || align=right | 2.7 km || 
|-id=398 bgcolor=#E9E9E9
| 164398 ||  || — || April 4, 2005 || Mount Lemmon || Mount Lemmon Survey || — || align=right | 2.0 km || 
|-id=399 bgcolor=#d6d6d6
| 164399 ||  || — || April 5, 2005 || Palomar || NEAT || — || align=right | 3.8 km || 
|-id=400 bgcolor=#FFC2E0
| 164400 ||  || — || April 7, 2005 || Kitt Peak || Spacewatch || APO +1kmPHA || align=right | 1.2 km || 
|}

164401–164500 

|-bgcolor=#E9E9E9
| 164401 ||  || — || April 4, 2005 || Kitt Peak || Spacewatch || — || align=right | 2.1 km || 
|-id=402 bgcolor=#d6d6d6
| 164402 ||  || — || April 10, 2005 || Kitt Peak || Spacewatch || AEG || align=right | 7.0 km || 
|-id=403 bgcolor=#d6d6d6
| 164403 ||  || — || April 12, 2005 || Socorro || LINEAR || HYG || align=right | 5.4 km || 
|-id=404 bgcolor=#E9E9E9
| 164404 ||  || — || May 6, 2005 || Catalina || CSS || — || align=right | 3.6 km || 
|-id=405 bgcolor=#E9E9E9
| 164405 ||  || — || October 24, 2005 || Mauna Kea || D. J. Tholen || — || align=right | 2.3 km || 
|-id=406 bgcolor=#fefefe
| 164406 ||  || — || October 24, 2005 || Mauna Kea || D. J. Tholen || — || align=right | 1.5 km || 
|-id=407 bgcolor=#fefefe
| 164407 ||  || — || December 27, 2005 || Mount Lemmon || Mount Lemmon Survey || — || align=right | 1.4 km || 
|-id=408 bgcolor=#fefefe
| 164408 ||  || — || December 30, 2005 || Catalina || CSS || H || align=right | 1.5 km || 
|-id=409 bgcolor=#fefefe
| 164409 ||  || — || December 28, 2005 || Mount Lemmon || Mount Lemmon Survey || FLO || align=right | 1.3 km || 
|-id=410 bgcolor=#d6d6d6
| 164410 ||  || — || December 27, 2005 || Kitt Peak || Spacewatch || TIR || align=right | 5.2 km || 
|-id=411 bgcolor=#fefefe
| 164411 ||  || — || January 4, 2006 || Mount Lemmon || Mount Lemmon Survey || — || align=right | 1.0 km || 
|-id=412 bgcolor=#fefefe
| 164412 ||  || — || January 6, 2006 || Kitt Peak || Spacewatch || NYS || align=right | 1.1 km || 
|-id=413 bgcolor=#fefefe
| 164413 ||  || — || January 4, 2006 || Catalina || CSS || — || align=right | 3.2 km || 
|-id=414 bgcolor=#fefefe
| 164414 ||  || — || January 19, 2006 || Catalina || CSS || H || align=right data-sort-value="0.85" | 850 m || 
|-id=415 bgcolor=#fefefe
| 164415 ||  || — || January 21, 2006 || Kitt Peak || Spacewatch || NYS || align=right | 1.1 km || 
|-id=416 bgcolor=#fefefe
| 164416 ||  || — || January 25, 2006 || Catalina || CSS || — || align=right | 2.7 km || 
|-id=417 bgcolor=#fefefe
| 164417 ||  || — || January 23, 2006 || Kitt Peak || Spacewatch || FLO || align=right data-sort-value="0.89" | 890 m || 
|-id=418 bgcolor=#fefefe
| 164418 ||  || — || January 26, 2006 || Kitt Peak || Spacewatch || — || align=right | 1.4 km || 
|-id=419 bgcolor=#fefefe
| 164419 ||  || — || January 26, 2006 || Kitt Peak || Spacewatch || NYS || align=right | 1.1 km || 
|-id=420 bgcolor=#E9E9E9
| 164420 ||  || — || January 26, 2006 || Kitt Peak || Spacewatch || — || align=right | 1.4 km || 
|-id=421 bgcolor=#d6d6d6
| 164421 ||  || — || January 27, 2006 || Mount Lemmon || Mount Lemmon Survey || — || align=right | 3.5 km || 
|-id=422 bgcolor=#fefefe
| 164422 ||  || — || January 26, 2006 || Kitt Peak || Spacewatch || NYS || align=right | 1.3 km || 
|-id=423 bgcolor=#fefefe
| 164423 ||  || — || January 28, 2006 || Mount Lemmon || Mount Lemmon Survey || FLO || align=right data-sort-value="0.95" | 950 m || 
|-id=424 bgcolor=#fefefe
| 164424 ||  || — || January 28, 2006 || Mount Lemmon || Mount Lemmon Survey || — || align=right | 2.6 km || 
|-id=425 bgcolor=#fefefe
| 164425 ||  || — || January 21, 2006 || Mount Lemmon || Mount Lemmon Survey || — || align=right | 1.7 km || 
|-id=426 bgcolor=#fefefe
| 164426 ||  || — || January 27, 2006 || Mount Lemmon || Mount Lemmon Survey || — || align=right | 1.4 km || 
|-id=427 bgcolor=#E9E9E9
| 164427 ||  || — || January 28, 2006 || Kitt Peak || Spacewatch || — || align=right | 2.3 km || 
|-id=428 bgcolor=#fefefe
| 164428 ||  || — || January 31, 2006 || Kitt Peak || Spacewatch || — || align=right | 1.0 km || 
|-id=429 bgcolor=#fefefe
| 164429 ||  || — || January 31, 2006 || Kitt Peak || Spacewatch || — || align=right | 1.5 km || 
|-id=430 bgcolor=#fefefe
| 164430 ||  || — || January 26, 2006 || Catalina || CSS || — || align=right | 1.5 km || 
|-id=431 bgcolor=#fefefe
| 164431 ||  || — || January 27, 2006 || Mount Lemmon || Mount Lemmon Survey || — || align=right data-sort-value="0.86" | 860 m || 
|-id=432 bgcolor=#E9E9E9
| 164432 ||  || — || February 1, 2006 || Kitt Peak || Spacewatch || — || align=right | 3.9 km || 
|-id=433 bgcolor=#fefefe
| 164433 ||  || — || February 2, 2006 || Mount Lemmon || Mount Lemmon Survey || V || align=right data-sort-value="0.88" | 880 m || 
|-id=434 bgcolor=#d6d6d6
| 164434 ||  || — || February 5, 2006 || Mount Lemmon || Mount Lemmon Survey || — || align=right | 4.3 km || 
|-id=435 bgcolor=#fefefe
| 164435 ||  || — || February 6, 2006 || Anderson Mesa || LONEOS || NYS || align=right | 1.2 km || 
|-id=436 bgcolor=#E9E9E9
| 164436 ||  || — || February 13, 2006 || Palomar || NEAT || — || align=right | 4.7 km || 
|-id=437 bgcolor=#fefefe
| 164437 ||  || — || February 1, 2006 || Kitt Peak || Spacewatch || FLO || align=right data-sort-value="0.94" | 940 m || 
|-id=438 bgcolor=#fefefe
| 164438 || 2006 DS || — || February 20, 2006 || Kitt Peak || Spacewatch || H || align=right data-sort-value="0.77" | 770 m || 
|-id=439 bgcolor=#fefefe
| 164439 ||  || — || February 20, 2006 || Catalina || CSS || H || align=right | 1.0 km || 
|-id=440 bgcolor=#fefefe
| 164440 ||  || — || February 22, 2006 || Catalina || CSS || — || align=right | 1.9 km || 
|-id=441 bgcolor=#fefefe
| 164441 ||  || — || February 20, 2006 || Kitt Peak || Spacewatch || MAS || align=right | 1.1 km || 
|-id=442 bgcolor=#fefefe
| 164442 ||  || — || February 20, 2006 || Mount Lemmon || Mount Lemmon Survey || MAS || align=right | 1.1 km || 
|-id=443 bgcolor=#d6d6d6
| 164443 ||  || — || February 20, 2006 || Kitt Peak || Spacewatch || YAK || align=right | 4.1 km || 
|-id=444 bgcolor=#fefefe
| 164444 ||  || — || February 21, 2006 || Kitt Peak || Spacewatch || — || align=right | 1.1 km || 
|-id=445 bgcolor=#fefefe
| 164445 ||  || — || February 21, 2006 || Mount Lemmon || Mount Lemmon Survey || MAS || align=right data-sort-value="0.96" | 960 m || 
|-id=446 bgcolor=#fefefe
| 164446 ||  || — || February 23, 2006 || Anderson Mesa || LONEOS || KLI || align=right | 3.2 km || 
|-id=447 bgcolor=#fefefe
| 164447 ||  || — || February 20, 2006 || Catalina || CSS || — || align=right | 2.3 km || 
|-id=448 bgcolor=#d6d6d6
| 164448 ||  || — || February 20, 2006 || Kitt Peak || Spacewatch || — || align=right | 3.4 km || 
|-id=449 bgcolor=#E9E9E9
| 164449 ||  || — || February 24, 2006 || Catalina || CSS || — || align=right | 1.7 km || 
|-id=450 bgcolor=#fefefe
| 164450 ||  || — || February 24, 2006 || Mount Lemmon || Mount Lemmon Survey || NYS || align=right | 1.1 km || 
|-id=451 bgcolor=#fefefe
| 164451 ||  || — || February 24, 2006 || Kitt Peak || Spacewatch || — || align=right | 1.7 km || 
|-id=452 bgcolor=#fefefe
| 164452 ||  || — || February 22, 2006 || Socorro || LINEAR || NYS || align=right | 1.3 km || 
|-id=453 bgcolor=#fefefe
| 164453 ||  || — || February 20, 2006 || Catalina || CSS || — || align=right | 1.5 km || 
|-id=454 bgcolor=#E9E9E9
| 164454 ||  || — || February 21, 2006 || Catalina || CSS || — || align=right | 1.7 km || 
|-id=455 bgcolor=#E9E9E9
| 164455 ||  || — || February 22, 2006 || Anderson Mesa || LONEOS || — || align=right | 1.7 km || 
|-id=456 bgcolor=#fefefe
| 164456 ||  || — || February 24, 2006 || Kitt Peak || Spacewatch || — || align=right | 1.1 km || 
|-id=457 bgcolor=#FA8072
| 164457 ||  || — || February 24, 2006 || Kitt Peak || Spacewatch || — || align=right | 1.4 km || 
|-id=458 bgcolor=#E9E9E9
| 164458 ||  || — || February 24, 2006 || Kitt Peak || Spacewatch || — || align=right | 3.8 km || 
|-id=459 bgcolor=#E9E9E9
| 164459 ||  || — || February 24, 2006 || Kitt Peak || Spacewatch || — || align=right | 2.5 km || 
|-id=460 bgcolor=#fefefe
| 164460 ||  || — || February 27, 2006 || Kitt Peak || Spacewatch || V || align=right | 1.2 km || 
|-id=461 bgcolor=#fefefe
| 164461 ||  || — || February 25, 2006 || Kitt Peak || Spacewatch || FLO || align=right data-sort-value="0.98" | 980 m || 
|-id=462 bgcolor=#fefefe
| 164462 ||  || — || February 25, 2006 || Kitt Peak || Spacewatch || NYS || align=right data-sort-value="0.94" | 940 m || 
|-id=463 bgcolor=#fefefe
| 164463 ||  || — || February 25, 2006 || Kitt Peak || Spacewatch || FLO || align=right | 1.2 km || 
|-id=464 bgcolor=#fefefe
| 164464 ||  || — || February 25, 2006 || Kitt Peak || Spacewatch || V || align=right | 1.0 km || 
|-id=465 bgcolor=#E9E9E9
| 164465 ||  || — || February 25, 2006 || Kitt Peak || Spacewatch || — || align=right | 3.5 km || 
|-id=466 bgcolor=#FA8072
| 164466 ||  || — || February 27, 2006 || Kitt Peak || Spacewatch || — || align=right | 1.7 km || 
|-id=467 bgcolor=#d6d6d6
| 164467 ||  || — || February 27, 2006 || Kitt Peak || Spacewatch || — || align=right | 6.1 km || 
|-id=468 bgcolor=#fefefe
| 164468 ||  || — || February 24, 2006 || Palomar || NEAT || — || align=right | 1.3 km || 
|-id=469 bgcolor=#fefefe
| 164469 ||  || — || February 28, 2006 || Socorro || LINEAR || FLO || align=right | 1.0 km || 
|-id=470 bgcolor=#fefefe
| 164470 ||  || — || February 24, 2006 || Palomar || NEAT || V || align=right | 1.0 km || 
|-id=471 bgcolor=#fefefe
| 164471 ||  || — || February 25, 2006 || Mount Lemmon || Mount Lemmon Survey || — || align=right | 1.1 km || 
|-id=472 bgcolor=#fefefe
| 164472 ||  || — || February 20, 2006 || Kitt Peak || Spacewatch || — || align=right | 1.1 km || 
|-id=473 bgcolor=#fefefe
| 164473 ||  || — || March 3, 2006 || Nyukasa || Mount Nyukasa Stn. || MAS || align=right | 1.2 km || 
|-id=474 bgcolor=#fefefe
| 164474 ||  || — || March 2, 2006 || Kitt Peak || Spacewatch || MAS || align=right | 1.3 km || 
|-id=475 bgcolor=#fefefe
| 164475 ||  || — || March 2, 2006 || Kitt Peak || Spacewatch || — || align=right | 1.0 km || 
|-id=476 bgcolor=#fefefe
| 164476 ||  || — || March 3, 2006 || Kitt Peak || Spacewatch || NYS || align=right | 1.8 km || 
|-id=477 bgcolor=#fefefe
| 164477 ||  || — || March 3, 2006 || Socorro || LINEAR || — || align=right | 1.2 km || 
|-id=478 bgcolor=#fefefe
| 164478 ||  || — || March 23, 2006 || Mount Lemmon || Mount Lemmon Survey || — || align=right | 1.2 km || 
|-id=479 bgcolor=#E9E9E9
| 164479 ||  || — || March 23, 2006 || Kitt Peak || Spacewatch || — || align=right | 2.1 km || 
|-id=480 bgcolor=#fefefe
| 164480 ||  || — || March 24, 2006 || Mount Lemmon || Mount Lemmon Survey || — || align=right | 1.0 km || 
|-id=481 bgcolor=#d6d6d6
| 164481 ||  || — || March 24, 2006 || Kitt Peak || Spacewatch || THM || align=right | 4.1 km || 
|-id=482 bgcolor=#E9E9E9
| 164482 ||  || — || March 24, 2006 || Kitt Peak || Spacewatch || — || align=right | 2.4 km || 
|-id=483 bgcolor=#fefefe
| 164483 ||  || — || March 24, 2006 || Socorro || LINEAR || — || align=right | 1.3 km || 
|-id=484 bgcolor=#d6d6d6
| 164484 ||  || — || March 25, 2006 || Kitt Peak || Spacewatch || THM || align=right | 3.6 km || 
|-id=485 bgcolor=#E9E9E9
| 164485 ||  || — || March 25, 2006 || Kitt Peak || Spacewatch || AGN || align=right | 1.6 km || 
|-id=486 bgcolor=#E9E9E9
| 164486 ||  || — || March 25, 2006 || Palomar || NEAT || — || align=right | 3.6 km || 
|-id=487 bgcolor=#fefefe
| 164487 ||  || — || March 23, 2006 || Catalina || CSS || — || align=right | 1.2 km || 
|-id=488 bgcolor=#fefefe
| 164488 ||  || — || March 26, 2006 || Kitt Peak || Spacewatch || — || align=right | 1.2 km || 
|-id=489 bgcolor=#fefefe
| 164489 ||  || — || March 26, 2006 || Mount Lemmon || Mount Lemmon Survey || — || align=right | 1.4 km || 
|-id=490 bgcolor=#fefefe
| 164490 ||  || — || March 24, 2006 || Mount Lemmon || Mount Lemmon Survey || — || align=right | 2.8 km || 
|-id=491 bgcolor=#E9E9E9
| 164491 ||  || — || March 25, 2006 || Palomar || NEAT || DOR || align=right | 4.2 km || 
|-id=492 bgcolor=#d6d6d6
| 164492 ||  || — || March 25, 2006 || Catalina || CSS || — || align=right | 7.5 km || 
|-id=493 bgcolor=#d6d6d6
| 164493 ||  || — || March 23, 2006 || Catalina || CSS || — || align=right | 7.6 km || 
|-id=494 bgcolor=#E9E9E9
| 164494 ||  || — || March 26, 2006 || Mount Lemmon || Mount Lemmon Survey || — || align=right | 1.3 km || 
|-id=495 bgcolor=#E9E9E9
| 164495 ||  || — || March 25, 2006 || Kitt Peak || Spacewatch || — || align=right | 1.5 km || 
|-id=496 bgcolor=#fefefe
| 164496 ||  || — || April 2, 2006 || Kitt Peak || Spacewatch || — || align=right | 1.2 km || 
|-id=497 bgcolor=#E9E9E9
| 164497 ||  || — || April 2, 2006 || Kitt Peak || Spacewatch || — || align=right | 3.5 km || 
|-id=498 bgcolor=#fefefe
| 164498 ||  || — || April 2, 2006 || Kitt Peak || Spacewatch || — || align=right | 1.3 km || 
|-id=499 bgcolor=#E9E9E9
| 164499 ||  || — || April 7, 2006 || Catalina || CSS || EUN || align=right | 1.8 km || 
|-id=500 bgcolor=#d6d6d6
| 164500 ||  || — || April 7, 2006 || Kitt Peak || Spacewatch || — || align=right | 4.7 km || 
|}

164501–164600 

|-bgcolor=#fefefe
| 164501 ||  || — || April 7, 2006 || Catalina || CSS || — || align=right | 1.3 km || 
|-id=502 bgcolor=#fefefe
| 164502 ||  || — || April 7, 2006 || Catalina || CSS || V || align=right | 1.1 km || 
|-id=503 bgcolor=#fefefe
| 164503 ||  || — || April 7, 2006 || Socorro || LINEAR || V || align=right data-sort-value="0.93" | 930 m || 
|-id=504 bgcolor=#E9E9E9
| 164504 ||  || — || April 7, 2006 || Anderson Mesa || LONEOS || — || align=right | 3.3 km || 
|-id=505 bgcolor=#fefefe
| 164505 ||  || — || April 2, 2006 || Mount Lemmon || Mount Lemmon Survey || — || align=right | 1.9 km || 
|-id=506 bgcolor=#E9E9E9
| 164506 ||  || — || April 7, 2006 || Socorro || LINEAR || TIN || align=right | 3.5 km || 
|-id=507 bgcolor=#E9E9E9
| 164507 ||  || — || April 8, 2006 || Kitt Peak || Spacewatch || — || align=right | 2.2 km || 
|-id=508 bgcolor=#d6d6d6
| 164508 ||  || — || April 5, 2006 || Siding Spring || SSS || — || align=right | 7.1 km || 
|-id=509 bgcolor=#d6d6d6
| 164509 ||  || — || April 2, 2006 || Catalina || CSS || — || align=right | 7.4 km || 
|-id=510 bgcolor=#E9E9E9
| 164510 ||  || — || April 2, 2006 || Mount Lemmon || Mount Lemmon Survey || — || align=right | 2.7 km || 
|-id=511 bgcolor=#d6d6d6
| 164511 ||  || — || April 18, 2006 || Catalina || CSS || — || align=right | 5.7 km || 
|-id=512 bgcolor=#d6d6d6
| 164512 ||  || — || April 18, 2006 || Palomar || NEAT || — || align=right | 7.6 km || 
|-id=513 bgcolor=#d6d6d6
| 164513 ||  || — || April 19, 2006 || Palomar || NEAT || EUP || align=right | 7.2 km || 
|-id=514 bgcolor=#E9E9E9
| 164514 ||  || — || April 19, 2006 || Kitt Peak || Spacewatch || NEM || align=right | 3.7 km || 
|-id=515 bgcolor=#E9E9E9
| 164515 ||  || — || April 19, 2006 || Anderson Mesa || LONEOS || — || align=right | 2.7 km || 
|-id=516 bgcolor=#fefefe
| 164516 ||  || — || April 19, 2006 || Palomar || NEAT || FLO || align=right data-sort-value="0.99" | 990 m || 
|-id=517 bgcolor=#d6d6d6
| 164517 ||  || — || April 20, 2006 || Kitt Peak || Spacewatch || 628 || align=right | 2.6 km || 
|-id=518 bgcolor=#E9E9E9
| 164518 Patoche ||  ||  || April 19, 2006 || Saint-Sulpice || B. Christophe || — || align=right | 2.5 km || 
|-id=519 bgcolor=#E9E9E9
| 164519 ||  || — || April 20, 2006 || Kitt Peak || Spacewatch || — || align=right | 1.4 km || 
|-id=520 bgcolor=#E9E9E9
| 164520 ||  || — || April 21, 2006 || Catalina || CSS || — || align=right | 2.2 km || 
|-id=521 bgcolor=#fefefe
| 164521 ||  || — || April 20, 2006 || Kitt Peak || Spacewatch || — || align=right | 1.2 km || 
|-id=522 bgcolor=#E9E9E9
| 164522 ||  || — || April 24, 2006 || Mount Lemmon || Mount Lemmon Survey || — || align=right | 2.7 km || 
|-id=523 bgcolor=#d6d6d6
| 164523 ||  || — || April 21, 2006 || Catalina || CSS || — || align=right | 5.3 km || 
|-id=524 bgcolor=#E9E9E9
| 164524 ||  || — || April 27, 2006 || Socorro || LINEAR || — || align=right | 4.7 km || 
|-id=525 bgcolor=#d6d6d6
| 164525 ||  || — || April 24, 2006 || Kitt Peak || Spacewatch || KOR || align=right | 2.4 km || 
|-id=526 bgcolor=#E9E9E9
| 164526 ||  || — || April 24, 2006 || Kitt Peak || Spacewatch || HEN || align=right | 1.2 km || 
|-id=527 bgcolor=#E9E9E9
| 164527 ||  || — || April 24, 2006 || Kitt Peak || Spacewatch || HOF || align=right | 4.3 km || 
|-id=528 bgcolor=#fefefe
| 164528 ||  || — || April 24, 2006 || Mount Lemmon || Mount Lemmon Survey || MAS || align=right | 1.4 km || 
|-id=529 bgcolor=#d6d6d6
| 164529 ||  || — || April 28, 2006 || Socorro || LINEAR || THM || align=right | 3.8 km || 
|-id=530 bgcolor=#fefefe
| 164530 ||  || — || April 21, 2006 || Catalina || CSS || — || align=right | 1.8 km || 
|-id=531 bgcolor=#fefefe
| 164531 ||  || — || April 30, 2006 || Kitt Peak || Spacewatch || FLO || align=right | 1.3 km || 
|-id=532 bgcolor=#fefefe
| 164532 ||  || — || April 30, 2006 || Kitt Peak || Spacewatch || MAS || align=right | 1.3 km || 
|-id=533 bgcolor=#fefefe
| 164533 ||  || — || April 30, 2006 || Kitt Peak || Spacewatch || EUT || align=right | 1.2 km || 
|-id=534 bgcolor=#E9E9E9
| 164534 ||  || — || April 26, 2006 || Socorro || LINEAR || — || align=right | 3.9 km || 
|-id=535 bgcolor=#E9E9E9
| 164535 ||  || — || April 25, 2006 || Palomar || NEAT || — || align=right | 1.3 km || 
|-id=536 bgcolor=#d6d6d6
| 164536 Davehinson ||  ||  || April 27, 2006 || Cerro Tololo || M. W. Buie || KOR || align=right | 1.6 km || 
|-id=537 bgcolor=#E9E9E9
| 164537 ||  || — || May 3, 2006 || Mount Lemmon || Mount Lemmon Survey || — || align=right | 1.2 km || 
|-id=538 bgcolor=#d6d6d6
| 164538 ||  || — || May 2, 2006 || Nyukasa || Mount Nyukasa Stn. || KOR || align=right | 2.0 km || 
|-id=539 bgcolor=#E9E9E9
| 164539 ||  || — || May 1, 2006 || Kitt Peak || Spacewatch || HEN || align=right | 1.4 km || 
|-id=540 bgcolor=#E9E9E9
| 164540 ||  || — || May 1, 2006 || Kitt Peak || Spacewatch || AGN || align=right | 1.4 km || 
|-id=541 bgcolor=#E9E9E9
| 164541 ||  || — || May 1, 2006 || Kitt Peak || Spacewatch || — || align=right | 2.4 km || 
|-id=542 bgcolor=#E9E9E9
| 164542 ||  || — || May 2, 2006 || Mount Lemmon || Mount Lemmon Survey || — || align=right | 2.7 km || 
|-id=543 bgcolor=#d6d6d6
| 164543 ||  || — || May 2, 2006 || Mount Lemmon || Mount Lemmon Survey || KOR || align=right | 1.8 km || 
|-id=544 bgcolor=#E9E9E9
| 164544 ||  || — || May 3, 2006 || Kitt Peak || Spacewatch || — || align=right | 3.5 km || 
|-id=545 bgcolor=#fefefe
| 164545 ||  || — || May 3, 2006 || Mount Lemmon || Mount Lemmon Survey || — || align=right | 1.3 km || 
|-id=546 bgcolor=#d6d6d6
| 164546 ||  || — || May 6, 2006 || Mount Lemmon || Mount Lemmon Survey || KOR || align=right | 2.3 km || 
|-id=547 bgcolor=#fefefe
| 164547 ||  || — || May 6, 2006 || Kitt Peak || Spacewatch || — || align=right | 1.4 km || 
|-id=548 bgcolor=#E9E9E9
| 164548 ||  || — || May 5, 2006 || Anderson Mesa || LONEOS || — || align=right | 2.8 km || 
|-id=549 bgcolor=#E9E9E9
| 164549 ||  || — || May 6, 2006 || Siding Spring || SSS || — || align=right | 3.5 km || 
|-id=550 bgcolor=#E9E9E9
| 164550 || 2006 KP || — || May 17, 2006 || Palomar || NEAT || — || align=right | 1.5 km || 
|-id=551 bgcolor=#E9E9E9
| 164551 ||  || — || May 19, 2006 || Reedy Creek || J. Broughton || — || align=right | 3.4 km || 
|-id=552 bgcolor=#E9E9E9
| 164552 ||  || — || May 19, 2006 || Mount Lemmon || Mount Lemmon Survey || — || align=right | 1.8 km || 
|-id=553 bgcolor=#E9E9E9
| 164553 ||  || — || May 19, 2006 || Mount Lemmon || Mount Lemmon Survey || — || align=right | 1.3 km || 
|-id=554 bgcolor=#E9E9E9
| 164554 ||  || — || May 19, 2006 || Catalina || CSS || — || align=right | 3.5 km || 
|-id=555 bgcolor=#d6d6d6
| 164555 ||  || — || May 20, 2006 || Catalina || CSS || — || align=right | 7.6 km || 
|-id=556 bgcolor=#d6d6d6
| 164556 ||  || — || May 20, 2006 || Palomar || NEAT || — || align=right | 4.4 km || 
|-id=557 bgcolor=#d6d6d6
| 164557 ||  || — || May 20, 2006 || Catalina || CSS || HYG || align=right | 4.2 km || 
|-id=558 bgcolor=#E9E9E9
| 164558 ||  || — || May 20, 2006 || Catalina || CSS || ADE || align=right | 4.1 km || 
|-id=559 bgcolor=#d6d6d6
| 164559 ||  || — || May 20, 2006 || Kitt Peak || Spacewatch || HYG || align=right | 5.8 km || 
|-id=560 bgcolor=#d6d6d6
| 164560 ||  || — || May 21, 2006 || Mount Lemmon || Mount Lemmon Survey || — || align=right | 3.1 km || 
|-id=561 bgcolor=#E9E9E9
| 164561 ||  || — || May 21, 2006 || Kitt Peak || Spacewatch || — || align=right | 3.5 km || 
|-id=562 bgcolor=#fefefe
| 164562 ||  || — || May 21, 2006 || Kitt Peak || Spacewatch || V || align=right | 1.4 km || 
|-id=563 bgcolor=#fefefe
| 164563 ||  || — || May 21, 2006 || Kitt Peak || Spacewatch || — || align=right | 1.4 km || 
|-id=564 bgcolor=#d6d6d6
| 164564 ||  || — || May 21, 2006 || Kitt Peak || Spacewatch || — || align=right | 3.5 km || 
|-id=565 bgcolor=#fefefe
| 164565 ||  || — || May 22, 2006 || Kitt Peak || Spacewatch || V || align=right | 1.4 km || 
|-id=566 bgcolor=#E9E9E9
| 164566 ||  || — || May 20, 2006 || Mount Lemmon || Mount Lemmon Survey || — || align=right | 2.8 km || 
|-id=567 bgcolor=#d6d6d6
| 164567 ||  || — || May 23, 2006 || Kitt Peak || Spacewatch || — || align=right | 4.1 km || 
|-id=568 bgcolor=#fefefe
| 164568 ||  || — || May 19, 2006 || Mount Lemmon || Mount Lemmon Survey || FLO || align=right data-sort-value="0.94" | 940 m || 
|-id=569 bgcolor=#fefefe
| 164569 ||  || — || May 19, 2006 || Mount Lemmon || Mount Lemmon Survey || EUT || align=right data-sort-value="0.99" | 990 m || 
|-id=570 bgcolor=#E9E9E9
| 164570 ||  || — || May 25, 2006 || Kitt Peak || Spacewatch || — || align=right | 2.4 km || 
|-id=571 bgcolor=#E9E9E9
| 164571 ||  || — || May 31, 2006 || Mount Lemmon || Mount Lemmon Survey || — || align=right | 4.3 km || 
|-id=572 bgcolor=#d6d6d6
| 164572 ||  || — || May 24, 2006 || Palomar || NEAT || — || align=right | 6.8 km || 
|-id=573 bgcolor=#E9E9E9
| 164573 ||  || — || May 28, 2006 || Socorro || LINEAR || — || align=right | 2.4 km || 
|-id=574 bgcolor=#d6d6d6
| 164574 ||  || — || June 17, 2006 || Kitt Peak || Spacewatch || — || align=right | 5.1 km || 
|-id=575 bgcolor=#d6d6d6
| 164575 ||  || — || June 19, 2006 || Mount Lemmon || Mount Lemmon Survey || HYG || align=right | 5.0 km || 
|-id=576 bgcolor=#d6d6d6
| 164576 ||  || — || September 17, 2006 || Kitt Peak || Spacewatch || URS || align=right | 5.0 km || 
|-id=577 bgcolor=#d6d6d6
| 164577 ||  || — || September 19, 2006 || Catalina || CSS || ALA || align=right | 6.9 km || 
|-id=578 bgcolor=#fefefe
| 164578 ||  || — || September 23, 2006 || Kitt Peak || Spacewatch || MAS || align=right | 1.1 km || 
|-id=579 bgcolor=#fefefe
| 164579 ||  || — || September 30, 2006 || Catalina || CSS || V || align=right data-sort-value="0.79" | 790 m || 
|-id=580 bgcolor=#fefefe
| 164580 ||  || — || September 30, 2006 || Catalina || CSS || — || align=right | 1.1 km || 
|-id=581 bgcolor=#d6d6d6
| 164581 ||  || — || October 12, 2006 || Kitt Peak || Spacewatch || LIX || align=right | 6.0 km || 
|-id=582 bgcolor=#d6d6d6
| 164582 ||  || — || November 27, 2006 || Mount Lemmon || Mount Lemmon Survey || KOR || align=right | 2.0 km || 
|-id=583 bgcolor=#E9E9E9
| 164583 ||  || — || January 24, 2007 || Catalina || CSS || — || align=right | 2.0 km || 
|-id=584 bgcolor=#E9E9E9
| 164584 ||  || — || February 17, 2007 || Kitt Peak || Spacewatch || AST || align=right | 2.3 km || 
|-id=585 bgcolor=#C2FFFF
| 164585 Oenomaos ||  ||  || July 13, 2007 || Marly || P. Kocher || L4 || align=right | 15 km || 
|-id=586 bgcolor=#E9E9E9
| 164586 Arlette ||  ||  || July 14, 2007 || Marly || P. Kocher || — || align=right | 1.6 km || 
|-id=587 bgcolor=#d6d6d6
| 164587 Taesch || 2007 OS ||  || July 17, 2007 || Chante-Perdrix || C. Rinner || — || align=right | 5.3 km || 
|-id=588 bgcolor=#fefefe
| 164588 || 2007 PP || — || August 3, 2007 || Eskridge || Farpoint Obs. || — || align=right | 1.2 km || 
|-id=589 bgcolor=#fefefe
| 164589 La Sagra ||  ||  || August 11, 2007 || OAM || OAM Obs. || EUT || align=right | 1.2 km || 
|-id=590 bgcolor=#E9E9E9
| 164590 ||  || — || August 11, 2007 || Reedy Creek || J. Broughton || MIS || align=right | 3.4 km || 
|-id=591 bgcolor=#fefefe
| 164591 || 2569 P-L || — || September 24, 1960 || Palomar || PLS || KLI || align=right | 2.6 km || 
|-id=592 bgcolor=#fefefe
| 164592 || 2761 P-L || — || September 24, 1960 || Palomar || PLS || ERI || align=right | 4.2 km || 
|-id=593 bgcolor=#d6d6d6
| 164593 || 4114 P-L || — || September 24, 1960 || Palomar || PLS || — || align=right | 4.9 km || 
|-id=594 bgcolor=#E9E9E9
| 164594 || 4144 P-L || — || September 24, 1960 || Palomar || PLS || — || align=right | 2.4 km || 
|-id=595 bgcolor=#fefefe
| 164595 || 4791 P-L || — || September 24, 1960 || Palomar || PLS || MAS || align=right data-sort-value="0.88" | 880 m || 
|-id=596 bgcolor=#d6d6d6
| 164596 || 4802 P-L || — || September 24, 1960 || Palomar || PLS || LUT || align=right | 7.2 km || 
|-id=597 bgcolor=#fefefe
| 164597 || 6025 P-L || — || September 24, 1960 || Palomar || PLS || — || align=right | 1.4 km || 
|-id=598 bgcolor=#fefefe
| 164598 || 6252 P-L || — || September 24, 1960 || Palomar || PLS || — || align=right | 1.3 km || 
|-id=599 bgcolor=#E9E9E9
| 164599 || 6366 P-L || — || September 24, 1960 || Palomar || PLS || DOR || align=right | 3.7 km || 
|-id=600 bgcolor=#E9E9E9
| 164600 || 1060 T-2 || — || September 29, 1973 || Palomar || PLS || EUN || align=right | 1.9 km || 
|}

164601–164700 

|-bgcolor=#fefefe
| 164601 || 1123 T-2 || — || September 29, 1973 || Palomar || PLS || — || align=right | 1.6 km || 
|-id=602 bgcolor=#fefefe
| 164602 || 1301 T-2 || — || September 29, 1973 || Palomar || PLS || — || align=right | 1.3 km || 
|-id=603 bgcolor=#fefefe
| 164603 || 1422 T-2 || — || September 29, 1973 || Palomar || PLS || FLO || align=right | 1.2 km || 
|-id=604 bgcolor=#d6d6d6
| 164604 || 2054 T-2 || — || September 29, 1973 || Palomar || PLS || YAK || align=right | 5.4 km || 
|-id=605 bgcolor=#E9E9E9
| 164605 || 4097 T-2 || — || September 29, 1973 || Palomar || PLS || — || align=right | 2.9 km || 
|-id=606 bgcolor=#E9E9E9
| 164606 || 3167 T-3 || — || October 16, 1977 || Palomar || PLS || — || align=right | 1.9 km || 
|-id=607 bgcolor=#fefefe
| 164607 || 3273 T-3 || — || October 16, 1977 || Palomar || PLS || MAS || align=right | 1.2 km || 
|-id=608 bgcolor=#fefefe
| 164608 || 3307 T-3 || — || October 16, 1977 || Palomar || PLS || — || align=right | 1.1 km || 
|-id=609 bgcolor=#fefefe
| 164609 || 3829 T-3 || — || October 16, 1977 || Palomar || PLS || — || align=right | 1.0 km || 
|-id=610 bgcolor=#d6d6d6
| 164610 || 3840 T-3 || — || October 16, 1977 || Palomar || PLS || KOR || align=right | 2.5 km || 
|-id=611 bgcolor=#fefefe
| 164611 || 4066 T-3 || — || October 16, 1977 || Palomar || PLS || — || align=right | 1.8 km || 
|-id=612 bgcolor=#fefefe
| 164612 || 5693 T-3 || — || October 16, 1977 || Palomar || PLS || — || align=right | 1.7 km || 
|-id=613 bgcolor=#E9E9E9
| 164613 ||  || — || March 1, 1981 || Siding Spring || S. J. Bus || EUN || align=right | 1.8 km || 
|-id=614 bgcolor=#d6d6d6
| 164614 ||  || — || March 2, 1981 || Siding Spring || S. J. Bus || — || align=right | 4.0 km || 
|-id=615 bgcolor=#E9E9E9
| 164615 ||  || — || September 3, 1981 || Palomar || S. J. Bus || MIT || align=right | 3.8 km || 
|-id=616 bgcolor=#E9E9E9
| 164616 ||  || — || November 30, 1986 || Kiso || H. Kosai, K. Furukawa || — || align=right | 1.9 km || 
|-id=617 bgcolor=#d6d6d6
| 164617 ||  || — || September 13, 1990 || La Silla || H. Debehogne || — || align=right | 3.2 km || 
|-id=618 bgcolor=#d6d6d6
| 164618 ||  || — || November 8, 1991 || Kitt Peak || Spacewatch || — || align=right | 4.7 km || 
|-id=619 bgcolor=#E9E9E9
| 164619 ||  || — || March 1, 1992 || La Silla || UESAC || — || align=right | 2.5 km || 
|-id=620 bgcolor=#fefefe
| 164620 ||  || — || September 2, 1992 || La Silla || E. W. Elst || NYS || align=right | 1.1 km || 
|-id=621 bgcolor=#fefefe
| 164621 ||  || — || September 24, 1992 || Kitt Peak || Spacewatch || MAS || align=right | 1.1 km || 
|-id=622 bgcolor=#E9E9E9
| 164622 ||  || — || March 17, 1993 || La Silla || UESAC || — || align=right | 1.6 km || 
|-id=623 bgcolor=#d6d6d6
| 164623 ||  || — || March 19, 1993 || La Silla || UESAC || — || align=right | 6.3 km || 
|-id=624 bgcolor=#fefefe
| 164624 ||  || — || March 19, 1993 || La Silla || UESAC || — || align=right | 1.4 km || 
|-id=625 bgcolor=#E9E9E9
| 164625 ||  || — || October 9, 1993 || La Silla || E. W. Elst || HOF || align=right | 4.4 km || 
|-id=626 bgcolor=#E9E9E9
| 164626 ||  || — || October 9, 1993 || La Silla || E. W. Elst || — || align=right | 3.2 km || 
|-id=627 bgcolor=#fefefe
| 164627 ||  || — || October 20, 1993 || La Silla || E. W. Elst || FLO || align=right data-sort-value="0.98" | 980 m || 
|-id=628 bgcolor=#fefefe
| 164628 ||  || — || October 20, 1993 || La Silla || E. W. Elst || — || align=right | 1.3 km || 
|-id=629 bgcolor=#d6d6d6
| 164629 ||  || — || January 11, 1994 || Kitt Peak || Spacewatch || 3:2 || align=right | 7.8 km || 
|-id=630 bgcolor=#E9E9E9
| 164630 ||  || — || August 10, 1994 || La Silla || E. W. Elst || — || align=right | 1.8 km || 
|-id=631 bgcolor=#E9E9E9
| 164631 ||  || — || September 12, 1994 || Kitt Peak || Spacewatch || — || align=right | 4.3 km || 
|-id=632 bgcolor=#fefefe
| 164632 ||  || — || September 3, 1994 || La Silla || E. W. Elst || — || align=right | 1.1 km || 
|-id=633 bgcolor=#E9E9E9
| 164633 ||  || — || September 28, 1994 || Kitt Peak || Spacewatch || HEN || align=right | 1.5 km || 
|-id=634 bgcolor=#E9E9E9
| 164634 ||  || — || October 28, 1994 || Kitt Peak || Spacewatch || — || align=right | 2.4 km || 
|-id=635 bgcolor=#E9E9E9
| 164635 ||  || — || November 28, 1994 || Kitt Peak || Spacewatch || ADE || align=right | 3.4 km || 
|-id=636 bgcolor=#fefefe
| 164636 ||  || — || January 29, 1995 || Kitt Peak || Spacewatch || — || align=right | 1.2 km || 
|-id=637 bgcolor=#fefefe
| 164637 ||  || — || February 4, 1995 || Kitt Peak || Spacewatch || — || align=right | 1.1 km || 
|-id=638 bgcolor=#d6d6d6
| 164638 ||  || — || March 29, 1995 || Kitt Peak || Spacewatch || — || align=right | 2.9 km || 
|-id=639 bgcolor=#fefefe
| 164639 ||  || — || March 29, 1995 || Kitt Peak || Spacewatch || — || align=right | 2.5 km || 
|-id=640 bgcolor=#fefefe
| 164640 ||  || — || April 5, 1995 || Kitt Peak || Spacewatch || NYS || align=right | 1.1 km || 
|-id=641 bgcolor=#d6d6d6
| 164641 ||  || — || June 29, 1995 || Kitt Peak || Spacewatch || — || align=right | 4.7 km || 
|-id=642 bgcolor=#E9E9E9
| 164642 ||  || — || September 17, 1995 || Kitt Peak || Spacewatch || — || align=right | 1.1 km || 
|-id=643 bgcolor=#d6d6d6
| 164643 ||  || — || September 18, 1995 || Kitt Peak || Spacewatch || HYG || align=right | 4.7 km || 
|-id=644 bgcolor=#d6d6d6
| 164644 ||  || — || September 18, 1995 || Kitt Peak || Spacewatch || — || align=right | 3.7 km || 
|-id=645 bgcolor=#d6d6d6
| 164645 ||  || — || September 26, 1995 || Kitt Peak || Spacewatch || — || align=right | 4.7 km || 
|-id=646 bgcolor=#E9E9E9
| 164646 ||  || — || September 26, 1995 || Kitt Peak || Spacewatch || — || align=right | 1.5 km || 
|-id=647 bgcolor=#d6d6d6
| 164647 ||  || — || October 20, 1995 || Kitt Peak || Spacewatch || — || align=right | 3.6 km || 
|-id=648 bgcolor=#d6d6d6
| 164648 ||  || — || October 21, 1995 || Kitt Peak || Spacewatch || — || align=right | 4.8 km || 
|-id=649 bgcolor=#E9E9E9
| 164649 ||  || — || November 15, 1995 || Kitt Peak || Spacewatch || — || align=right | 2.3 km || 
|-id=650 bgcolor=#E9E9E9
| 164650 ||  || — || November 21, 1995 || Kitt Peak || Spacewatch || — || align=right | 2.3 km || 
|-id=651 bgcolor=#E9E9E9
| 164651 ||  || — || January 12, 1996 || Kitt Peak || Spacewatch || — || align=right | 2.2 km || 
|-id=652 bgcolor=#E9E9E9
| 164652 ||  || — || January 15, 1996 || Kitt Peak || Spacewatch || — || align=right | 2.3 km || 
|-id=653 bgcolor=#fefefe
| 164653 ||  || — || March 19, 1996 || Kitt Peak || Spacewatch || — || align=right data-sort-value="0.95" | 950 m || 
|-id=654 bgcolor=#E9E9E9
| 164654 ||  || — || April 14, 1996 || Kitt Peak || Spacewatch || — || align=right | 4.2 km || 
|-id=655 bgcolor=#fefefe
| 164655 ||  || — || April 22, 1996 || Haleakala || AMOS || — || align=right | 1.1 km || 
|-id=656 bgcolor=#fefefe
| 164656 ||  || — || September 15, 1996 || Xinglong || SCAP || — || align=right | 1.4 km || 
|-id=657 bgcolor=#fefefe
| 164657 ||  || — || September 5, 1996 || Kitt Peak || Spacewatch || — || align=right | 2.7 km || 
|-id=658 bgcolor=#d6d6d6
| 164658 ||  || — || September 7, 1996 || Kitt Peak || Spacewatch || URS || align=right | 6.4 km || 
|-id=659 bgcolor=#d6d6d6
| 164659 ||  || — || September 8, 1996 || Kitt Peak || Spacewatch || HYG || align=right | 5.7 km || 
|-id=660 bgcolor=#fefefe
| 164660 ||  || — || September 13, 1996 || Kitt Peak || Spacewatch || NYS || align=right | 1.1 km || 
|-id=661 bgcolor=#d6d6d6
| 164661 ||  || — || September 17, 1996 || Xinglong || SCAP || — || align=right | 4.5 km || 
|-id=662 bgcolor=#d6d6d6
| 164662 ||  || — || October 13, 1996 || Needville || W. G. Dillon, R. Pepper || EOS || align=right | 3.0 km || 
|-id=663 bgcolor=#fefefe
| 164663 ||  || — || October 5, 1996 || Xinglong || SCAP || MAS || align=right data-sort-value="0.96" | 960 m || 
|-id=664 bgcolor=#fefefe
| 164664 ||  || — || October 4, 1996 || Kitt Peak || Spacewatch || — || align=right | 1.3 km || 
|-id=665 bgcolor=#d6d6d6
| 164665 ||  || — || October 5, 1996 || Kitt Peak || Spacewatch || — || align=right | 5.2 km || 
|-id=666 bgcolor=#fefefe
| 164666 ||  || — || October 7, 1996 || Kitt Peak || Spacewatch || MAS || align=right | 1.1 km || 
|-id=667 bgcolor=#fefefe
| 164667 ||  || — || October 11, 1996 || Kitt Peak || Spacewatch || MAS || align=right | 1.4 km || 
|-id=668 bgcolor=#fefefe
| 164668 ||  || — || October 2, 1996 || La Silla || E. W. Elst || V || align=right | 1.1 km || 
|-id=669 bgcolor=#d6d6d6
| 164669 ||  || — || November 10, 1996 || Kitt Peak || Spacewatch || — || align=right | 4.9 km || 
|-id=670 bgcolor=#FA8072
| 164670 ||  || — || December 3, 1996 || Nachi-Katsuura || Y. Shimizu, T. Urata || — || align=right | 1.7 km || 
|-id=671 bgcolor=#fefefe
| 164671 ||  || — || December 4, 1996 || Kitt Peak || Spacewatch || V || align=right | 1.3 km || 
|-id=672 bgcolor=#fefefe
| 164672 ||  || — || December 14, 1996 || Kitt Peak || Spacewatch || MAS || align=right | 1.3 km || 
|-id=673 bgcolor=#d6d6d6
| 164673 ||  || — || January 31, 1997 || Kitt Peak || Spacewatch || 7:4 || align=right | 6.6 km || 
|-id=674 bgcolor=#E9E9E9
| 164674 ||  || — || March 2, 1997 || Kitt Peak || Spacewatch || — || align=right | 4.6 km || 
|-id=675 bgcolor=#E9E9E9
| 164675 ||  || — || March 4, 1997 || Kitt Peak || Spacewatch || — || align=right | 2.2 km || 
|-id=676 bgcolor=#E9E9E9
| 164676 ||  || — || March 2, 1997 || Bologna || San Vittore Obs. || — || align=right | 3.8 km || 
|-id=677 bgcolor=#E9E9E9
| 164677 ||  || — || April 8, 1997 || Kleť || Kleť Obs. || — || align=right | 2.5 km || 
|-id=678 bgcolor=#E9E9E9
| 164678 ||  || — || April 7, 1997 || Kitt Peak || Spacewatch || — || align=right | 1.5 km || 
|-id=679 bgcolor=#E9E9E9
| 164679 ||  || — || April 3, 1997 || Socorro || LINEAR || — || align=right | 2.3 km || 
|-id=680 bgcolor=#E9E9E9
| 164680 ||  || — || April 5, 1997 || Socorro || LINEAR || — || align=right | 2.6 km || 
|-id=681 bgcolor=#E9E9E9
| 164681 ||  || — || May 27, 1997 || Caussols || ODAS || EUN || align=right | 2.3 km || 
|-id=682 bgcolor=#E9E9E9
| 164682 ||  || — || June 1, 1997 || Kitt Peak || Spacewatch || EUN || align=right | 2.4 km || 
|-id=683 bgcolor=#E9E9E9
| 164683 ||  || — || June 5, 1997 || Kitt Peak || Spacewatch || — || align=right | 2.1 km || 
|-id=684 bgcolor=#E9E9E9
| 164684 ||  || — || June 7, 1997 || Kitt Peak || Spacewatch || — || align=right | 2.0 km || 
|-id=685 bgcolor=#fefefe
| 164685 ||  || — || June 7, 1997 || La Silla || E. W. Elst || — || align=right data-sort-value="0.98" | 980 m || 
|-id=686 bgcolor=#E9E9E9
| 164686 ||  || — || June 26, 1997 || Kitt Peak || Spacewatch || — || align=right | 3.9 km || 
|-id=687 bgcolor=#E9E9E9
| 164687 ||  || — || June 26, 1997 || Kitt Peak || Spacewatch || — || align=right | 4.0 km || 
|-id=688 bgcolor=#fefefe
| 164688 ||  || — || September 21, 1997 || Ondřejov || L. Kotková || — || align=right | 1.2 km || 
|-id=689 bgcolor=#d6d6d6
| 164689 ||  || — || September 23, 1997 || Kitt Peak || Spacewatch || — || align=right | 2.9 km || 
|-id=690 bgcolor=#fefefe
| 164690 ||  || — || September 23, 1997 || Kitt Peak || Spacewatch || FLO || align=right | 1.1 km || 
|-id=691 bgcolor=#fefefe
| 164691 ||  || — || September 28, 1997 || Kitt Peak || Spacewatch || — || align=right | 1.1 km || 
|-id=692 bgcolor=#d6d6d6
| 164692 ||  || — || October 4, 1997 || Kitt Peak || Spacewatch || — || align=right | 3.4 km || 
|-id=693 bgcolor=#fefefe
| 164693 ||  || — || October 11, 1997 || Kitt Peak || Spacewatch || — || align=right | 1.2 km || 
|-id=694 bgcolor=#fefefe
| 164694 ||  || — || October 23, 1997 || Kitt Peak || Spacewatch || — || align=right data-sort-value="0.85" | 850 m || 
|-id=695 bgcolor=#d6d6d6
| 164695 ||  || — || October 23, 1997 || Kitt Peak || Spacewatch || — || align=right | 2.7 km || 
|-id=696 bgcolor=#d6d6d6
| 164696 ||  || — || November 23, 1997 || Chichibu || N. Satō || EOS || align=right | 7.2 km || 
|-id=697 bgcolor=#fefefe
| 164697 ||  || — || November 28, 1997 || Kitt Peak || Spacewatch || — || align=right | 1.4 km || 
|-id=698 bgcolor=#d6d6d6
| 164698 ||  || — || November 26, 1997 || Socorro || LINEAR || — || align=right | 4.8 km || 
|-id=699 bgcolor=#d6d6d6
| 164699 ||  || — || December 5, 1997 || Caussols || ODAS || — || align=right | 4.0 km || 
|-id=700 bgcolor=#fefefe
| 164700 ||  || — || January 6, 1998 || Kitt Peak || Spacewatch || V || align=right | 1.2 km || 
|}

164701–164800 

|-bgcolor=#fefefe
| 164701 Horanyi ||  ||  || January 7, 1998 || Anderson Mesa || M. W. Buie || EUT || align=right | 1.4 km || 
|-id=702 bgcolor=#fefefe
| 164702 ||  || — || January 22, 1998 || Kitt Peak || Spacewatch || MAS || align=right | 1.2 km || 
|-id=703 bgcolor=#d6d6d6
| 164703 ||  || — || January 22, 1998 || Kitt Peak || Spacewatch || EOS || align=right | 3.2 km || 
|-id=704 bgcolor=#fefefe
| 164704 ||  || — || January 26, 1998 || Kitt Peak || Spacewatch || — || align=right | 1.3 km || 
|-id=705 bgcolor=#fefefe
| 164705 ||  || — || February 17, 1998 || Kitt Peak || Spacewatch || — || align=right | 1.2 km || 
|-id=706 bgcolor=#fefefe
| 164706 ||  || — || February 24, 1998 || Kitt Peak || Spacewatch || V || align=right data-sort-value="0.94" | 940 m || 
|-id=707 bgcolor=#fefefe
| 164707 ||  || — || February 26, 1998 || Kitt Peak || Spacewatch || V || align=right | 1.2 km || 
|-id=708 bgcolor=#fefefe
| 164708 ||  || — || March 20, 1998 || Kitt Peak || Spacewatch || — || align=right data-sort-value="0.97" | 970 m || 
|-id=709 bgcolor=#E9E9E9
| 164709 ||  || — || March 24, 1998 || Caussols || ODAS || — || align=right | 1.4 km || 
|-id=710 bgcolor=#fefefe
| 164710 ||  || — || March 20, 1998 || Socorro || LINEAR || — || align=right | 1.2 km || 
|-id=711 bgcolor=#fefefe
| 164711 ||  || — || March 20, 1998 || Socorro || LINEAR || — || align=right | 2.7 km || 
|-id=712 bgcolor=#fefefe
| 164712 ||  || — || March 20, 1998 || Socorro || LINEAR || NYS || align=right | 1.3 km || 
|-id=713 bgcolor=#fefefe
| 164713 ||  || — || March 20, 1998 || Socorro || LINEAR || MAS || align=right | 1.3 km || 
|-id=714 bgcolor=#FA8072
| 164714 ||  || — || March 24, 1998 || Socorro || LINEAR || — || align=right | 1.1 km || 
|-id=715 bgcolor=#fefefe
| 164715 ||  || — || March 28, 1998 || Socorro || LINEAR || KLI || align=right | 3.5 km || 
|-id=716 bgcolor=#FA8072
| 164716 || 1998 GH || — || April 2, 1998 || Socorro || LINEAR || H || align=right | 2.3 km || 
|-id=717 bgcolor=#fefefe
| 164717 ||  || — || April 6, 1998 || Kleť || Kleť Obs. || MAS || align=right | 1.3 km || 
|-id=718 bgcolor=#fefefe
| 164718 ||  || — || April 21, 1998 || Socorro || LINEAR || H || align=right data-sort-value="0.98" | 980 m || 
|-id=719 bgcolor=#fefefe
| 164719 ||  || — || April 21, 1998 || Socorro || LINEAR || H || align=right | 1.1 km || 
|-id=720 bgcolor=#fefefe
| 164720 ||  || — || May 22, 1998 || Socorro || LINEAR || — || align=right | 2.2 km || 
|-id=721 bgcolor=#E9E9E9
| 164721 ||  || — || August 17, 1998 || Socorro || LINEAR || — || align=right | 2.3 km || 
|-id=722 bgcolor=#E9E9E9
| 164722 ||  || — || August 24, 1998 || Socorro || LINEAR || — || align=right | 4.5 km || 
|-id=723 bgcolor=#E9E9E9
| 164723 ||  || — || August 24, 1998 || Socorro || LINEAR || — || align=right | 4.5 km || 
|-id=724 bgcolor=#E9E9E9
| 164724 ||  || — || August 24, 1998 || Socorro || LINEAR || MAR || align=right | 2.2 km || 
|-id=725 bgcolor=#FA8072
| 164725 ||  || — || August 28, 1998 || Socorro || LINEAR || — || align=right | 3.0 km || 
|-id=726 bgcolor=#E9E9E9
| 164726 ||  || — || August 19, 1998 || Xinglong || SCAP || IANfast? || align=right | 1.9 km || 
|-id=727 bgcolor=#E9E9E9
| 164727 ||  || — || September 15, 1998 || Caussols || ODAS || — || align=right | 2.8 km || 
|-id=728 bgcolor=#E9E9E9
| 164728 ||  || — || September 14, 1998 || Kitt Peak || Spacewatch || — || align=right | 2.3 km || 
|-id=729 bgcolor=#E9E9E9
| 164729 ||  || — || September 14, 1998 || Socorro || LINEAR || — || align=right | 3.4 km || 
|-id=730 bgcolor=#E9E9E9
| 164730 ||  || — || September 14, 1998 || Socorro || LINEAR || — || align=right | 2.6 km || 
|-id=731 bgcolor=#E9E9E9
| 164731 ||  || — || September 14, 1998 || Socorro || LINEAR || — || align=right | 2.4 km || 
|-id=732 bgcolor=#E9E9E9
| 164732 ||  || — || September 14, 1998 || Socorro || LINEAR || — || align=right | 3.5 km || 
|-id=733 bgcolor=#E9E9E9
| 164733 ||  || — || September 14, 1998 || Socorro || LINEAR || — || align=right | 2.5 km || 
|-id=734 bgcolor=#E9E9E9
| 164734 ||  || — || September 21, 1998 || Kitt Peak || Spacewatch || — || align=right | 3.8 km || 
|-id=735 bgcolor=#E9E9E9
| 164735 ||  || — || September 18, 1998 || Anderson Mesa || LONEOS || — || align=right | 4.5 km || 
|-id=736 bgcolor=#E9E9E9
| 164736 ||  || — || September 24, 1998 || Kitt Peak || Spacewatch || — || align=right | 2.3 km || 
|-id=737 bgcolor=#E9E9E9
| 164737 ||  || — || September 26, 1998 || Kitt Peak || Spacewatch || — || align=right | 3.4 km || 
|-id=738 bgcolor=#E9E9E9
| 164738 ||  || — || September 26, 1998 || Socorro || LINEAR || — || align=right | 4.6 km || 
|-id=739 bgcolor=#E9E9E9
| 164739 ||  || — || September 26, 1998 || Socorro || LINEAR || — || align=right | 3.5 km || 
|-id=740 bgcolor=#E9E9E9
| 164740 ||  || — || September 26, 1998 || Socorro || LINEAR || — || align=right | 3.7 km || 
|-id=741 bgcolor=#E9E9E9
| 164741 ||  || — || September 26, 1998 || Socorro || LINEAR || — || align=right | 2.9 km || 
|-id=742 bgcolor=#E9E9E9
| 164742 ||  || — || September 26, 1998 || Socorro || LINEAR || — || align=right | 4.0 km || 
|-id=743 bgcolor=#E9E9E9
| 164743 ||  || — || September 26, 1998 || Socorro || LINEAR || — || align=right | 3.0 km || 
|-id=744 bgcolor=#E9E9E9
| 164744 ||  || — || September 26, 1998 || Socorro || LINEAR || — || align=right | 6.5 km || 
|-id=745 bgcolor=#E9E9E9
| 164745 ||  || — || October 12, 1998 || Kitt Peak || Spacewatch || — || align=right | 2.9 km || 
|-id=746 bgcolor=#E9E9E9
| 164746 ||  || — || October 13, 1998 || Kitt Peak || Spacewatch || — || align=right | 3.4 km || 
|-id=747 bgcolor=#E9E9E9
| 164747 ||  || — || October 13, 1998 || Kitt Peak || Spacewatch || — || align=right | 3.4 km || 
|-id=748 bgcolor=#E9E9E9
| 164748 ||  || — || October 13, 1998 || Kitt Peak || Spacewatch || — || align=right | 2.4 km || 
|-id=749 bgcolor=#E9E9E9
| 164749 ||  || — || October 13, 1998 || Kitt Peak || Spacewatch || HOF || align=right | 2.8 km || 
|-id=750 bgcolor=#E9E9E9
| 164750 ||  || — || October 14, 1998 || Xinglong || SCAP || — || align=right | 3.5 km || 
|-id=751 bgcolor=#E9E9E9
| 164751 ||  || — || October 20, 1998 || Caussols || ODAS || — || align=right | 4.0 km || 
|-id=752 bgcolor=#E9E9E9
| 164752 ||  || — || October 18, 1998 || Xinglong || SCAP || — || align=right | 4.3 km || 
|-id=753 bgcolor=#E9E9E9
| 164753 ||  || — || October 28, 1998 || Socorro || LINEAR || — || align=right | 4.3 km || 
|-id=754 bgcolor=#E9E9E9
| 164754 ||  || — || November 10, 1998 || Socorro || LINEAR || CLO || align=right | 3.4 km || 
|-id=755 bgcolor=#E9E9E9
| 164755 ||  || — || November 10, 1998 || Socorro || LINEAR || GEF || align=right | 2.5 km || 
|-id=756 bgcolor=#E9E9E9
| 164756 ||  || — || November 9, 1998 || Xinglong || SCAP || — || align=right | 3.7 km || 
|-id=757 bgcolor=#E9E9E9
| 164757 ||  || — || November 12, 1998 || Xinglong || SCAP || — || align=right | 3.4 km || 
|-id=758 bgcolor=#E9E9E9
| 164758 ||  || — || November 10, 1998 || Socorro || LINEAR || — || align=right | 5.4 km || 
|-id=759 bgcolor=#E9E9E9
| 164759 ||  || — || November 11, 1998 || Anderson Mesa || LONEOS || — || align=right | 3.3 km || 
|-id=760 bgcolor=#E9E9E9
| 164760 ||  || — || November 17, 1998 || Caussols || ODAS || GEF || align=right | 2.7 km || 
|-id=761 bgcolor=#E9E9E9
| 164761 ||  || — || November 24, 1998 || Baton Rouge || W. R. Cooney Jr., P. M. Motl || — || align=right | 3.2 km || 
|-id=762 bgcolor=#E9E9E9
| 164762 ||  || — || November 18, 1998 || Kitt Peak || Spacewatch || — || align=right | 4.5 km || 
|-id=763 bgcolor=#E9E9E9
| 164763 ||  || — || November 23, 1998 || Kitt Peak || Spacewatch || — || align=right | 3.2 km || 
|-id=764 bgcolor=#E9E9E9
| 164764 ||  || — || December 7, 1998 || Caussols || ODAS || AEO || align=right | 2.0 km || 
|-id=765 bgcolor=#E9E9E9
| 164765 ||  || — || December 7, 1998 || Caussols || ODAS || — || align=right | 2.7 km || 
|-id=766 bgcolor=#E9E9E9
| 164766 ||  || — || December 15, 1998 || Caussols || ODAS || — || align=right | 2.9 km || 
|-id=767 bgcolor=#E9E9E9
| 164767 ||  || — || December 18, 1998 || Woomera || F. B. Zoltowski || — || align=right | 5.1 km || 
|-id=768 bgcolor=#d6d6d6
| 164768 ||  || — || December 26, 1998 || Kitt Peak || Spacewatch || — || align=right | 2.6 km || 
|-id=769 bgcolor=#d6d6d6
| 164769 ||  || — || January 9, 1999 || Xinglong || SCAP || ITH || align=right | 2.6 km || 
|-id=770 bgcolor=#E9E9E9
| 164770 ||  || — || January 16, 1999 || Socorro || LINEAR || GEF || align=right | 1.8 km || 
|-id=771 bgcolor=#d6d6d6
| 164771 ||  || — || February 12, 1999 || Oohira || T. Urata || — || align=right | 4.5 km || 
|-id=772 bgcolor=#d6d6d6
| 164772 ||  || — || February 10, 1999 || Socorro || LINEAR || — || align=right | 4.6 km || 
|-id=773 bgcolor=#fefefe
| 164773 ||  || — || February 10, 1999 || Socorro || LINEAR || — || align=right | 1.3 km || 
|-id=774 bgcolor=#d6d6d6
| 164774 ||  || — || February 10, 1999 || Socorro || LINEAR || — || align=right | 5.4 km || 
|-id=775 bgcolor=#d6d6d6
| 164775 ||  || — || February 11, 1999 || Socorro || LINEAR || — || align=right | 3.7 km || 
|-id=776 bgcolor=#d6d6d6
| 164776 ||  || — || February 7, 1999 || Kitt Peak || Spacewatch || THM || align=right | 5.3 km || 
|-id=777 bgcolor=#d6d6d6
| 164777 ||  || — || February 10, 1999 || Kitt Peak || Spacewatch || — || align=right | 4.1 km || 
|-id=778 bgcolor=#d6d6d6
| 164778 ||  || — || February 13, 1999 || Kitt Peak || Spacewatch || KOR || align=right | 2.3 km || 
|-id=779 bgcolor=#d6d6d6
| 164779 ||  || — || February 8, 1999 || Kitt Peak || Spacewatch || — || align=right | 5.9 km || 
|-id=780 bgcolor=#fefefe
| 164780 ||  || — || February 8, 1999 || Kitt Peak || Spacewatch || FLO || align=right | 1.1 km || 
|-id=781 bgcolor=#d6d6d6
| 164781 ||  || — || February 20, 1999 || Goodricke-Pigott || R. A. Tucker || — || align=right | 2.8 km || 
|-id=782 bgcolor=#d6d6d6
| 164782 ||  || — || February 16, 1999 || Ondřejov || Ondřejov Obs. || — || align=right | 3.7 km || 
|-id=783 bgcolor=#d6d6d6
| 164783 ||  || — || March 9, 1999 || Kitt Peak || Spacewatch || THM || align=right | 4.5 km || 
|-id=784 bgcolor=#fefefe
| 164784 ||  || — || March 15, 1999 || Kitt Peak || Spacewatch || — || align=right | 1.2 km || 
|-id=785 bgcolor=#fefefe
| 164785 ||  || — || March 14, 1999 || Kitt Peak || Spacewatch || — || align=right | 1.3 km || 
|-id=786 bgcolor=#fefefe
| 164786 ||  || — || March 16, 1999 || Kitt Peak || Spacewatch || — || align=right | 1.3 km || 
|-id=787 bgcolor=#fefefe
| 164787 ||  || — || March 17, 1999 || Kitt Peak || Spacewatch || — || align=right | 1.7 km || 
|-id=788 bgcolor=#d6d6d6
| 164788 ||  || — || March 18, 1999 || Kitt Peak || Spacewatch || — || align=right | 3.9 km || 
|-id=789 bgcolor=#fefefe
| 164789 ||  || — || March 22, 1999 || Anderson Mesa || LONEOS || — || align=right | 3.9 km || 
|-id=790 bgcolor=#fefefe
| 164790 ||  || — || March 20, 1999 || Socorro || LINEAR || FLO || align=right | 2.0 km || 
|-id=791 bgcolor=#fefefe
| 164791 Nicinski ||  ||  || March 20, 1999 || Apache Point || SDSS || NYS || align=right data-sort-value="0.91" | 910 m || 
|-id=792 bgcolor=#fefefe
| 164792 Owen ||  ||  || March 20, 1999 || Apache Point || SDSS || FLO || align=right | 1.1 km || 
|-id=793 bgcolor=#fefefe
| 164793 ||  || — || April 7, 1999 || Anderson Mesa || LONEOS || — || align=right | 1.3 km || 
|-id=794 bgcolor=#fefefe
| 164794 ||  || — || April 11, 1999 || Kitt Peak || Spacewatch || V || align=right | 1.0 km || 
|-id=795 bgcolor=#d6d6d6
| 164795 ||  || — || April 11, 1999 || Kitt Peak || Spacewatch || — || align=right | 3.3 km || 
|-id=796 bgcolor=#d6d6d6
| 164796 ||  || — || April 14, 1999 || Kitt Peak || Spacewatch || — || align=right | 3.3 km || 
|-id=797 bgcolor=#fefefe
| 164797 ||  || — || April 6, 1999 || Socorro || LINEAR || — || align=right | 1.4 km || 
|-id=798 bgcolor=#d6d6d6
| 164798 ||  || — || May 7, 1999 || Catalina || CSS || VER || align=right | 5.4 km || 
|-id=799 bgcolor=#fefefe
| 164799 ||  || — || May 10, 1999 || Socorro || LINEAR || — || align=right data-sort-value="0.92" | 920 m || 
|-id=800 bgcolor=#fefefe
| 164800 ||  || — || May 10, 1999 || Socorro || LINEAR || NYS || align=right | 1.5 km || 
|}

164801–164900 

|-bgcolor=#fefefe
| 164801 ||  || — || May 10, 1999 || Socorro || LINEAR || — || align=right | 2.0 km || 
|-id=802 bgcolor=#fefefe
| 164802 ||  || — || May 10, 1999 || Socorro || LINEAR || FLO || align=right | 1.3 km || 
|-id=803 bgcolor=#fefefe
| 164803 ||  || — || May 12, 1999 || Socorro || LINEAR || — || align=right | 2.9 km || 
|-id=804 bgcolor=#fefefe
| 164804 ||  || — || May 9, 1999 || Bergisch Gladbach || W. Bickel || — || align=right | 1.4 km || 
|-id=805 bgcolor=#fefefe
| 164805 ||  || — || May 13, 1999 || Socorro || LINEAR || — || align=right | 1.2 km || 
|-id=806 bgcolor=#fefefe
| 164806 ||  || — || May 13, 1999 || Socorro || LINEAR || NYS || align=right | 3.9 km || 
|-id=807 bgcolor=#fefefe
| 164807 ||  || — || May 13, 1999 || Socorro || LINEAR || NYS || align=right | 1.0 km || 
|-id=808 bgcolor=#d6d6d6
| 164808 ||  || — || May 13, 1999 || Socorro || LINEAR || 7:4 || align=right | 7.4 km || 
|-id=809 bgcolor=#fefefe
| 164809 ||  || — || May 13, 1999 || Socorro || LINEAR || — || align=right | 1.7 km || 
|-id=810 bgcolor=#fefefe
| 164810 ||  || — || May 10, 1999 || Socorro || LINEAR || — || align=right | 1.5 km || 
|-id=811 bgcolor=#fefefe
| 164811 ||  || — || May 7, 1999 || Anderson Mesa || LONEOS || ERI || align=right | 3.1 km || 
|-id=812 bgcolor=#fefefe
| 164812 ||  || — || May 17, 1999 || Catalina || CSS || NYS || align=right data-sort-value="0.90" | 900 m || 
|-id=813 bgcolor=#fefefe
| 164813 ||  || — || June 8, 1999 || Socorro || LINEAR || — || align=right | 3.7 km || 
|-id=814 bgcolor=#fefefe
| 164814 ||  || — || June 8, 1999 || Kitt Peak || Spacewatch || NYS || align=right | 1.0 km || 
|-id=815 bgcolor=#fefefe
| 164815 ||  || — || July 13, 1999 || Socorro || LINEAR || — || align=right | 1.8 km || 
|-id=816 bgcolor=#E9E9E9
| 164816 ||  || — || August 12, 1999 || Kitt Peak || Spacewatch || — || align=right | 1.2 km || 
|-id=817 bgcolor=#E9E9E9
| 164817 || 1999 QW || — || August 17, 1999 || Kitt Peak || Spacewatch || KON || align=right | 4.6 km || 
|-id=818 bgcolor=#E9E9E9
| 164818 ||  || — || September 14, 1999 || Kleť || Kleť Obs. || EUN || align=right | 2.2 km || 
|-id=819 bgcolor=#fefefe
| 164819 ||  || — || September 7, 1999 || Socorro || LINEAR || — || align=right | 1.6 km || 
|-id=820 bgcolor=#E9E9E9
| 164820 ||  || — || September 7, 1999 || Socorro || LINEAR || — || align=right | 2.0 km || 
|-id=821 bgcolor=#fefefe
| 164821 ||  || — || September 9, 1999 || Socorro || LINEAR || — || align=right | 1.5 km || 
|-id=822 bgcolor=#fefefe
| 164822 ||  || — || September 9, 1999 || Socorro || LINEAR || — || align=right | 2.0 km || 
|-id=823 bgcolor=#E9E9E9
| 164823 ||  || — || September 9, 1999 || Socorro || LINEAR || — || align=right | 1.4 km || 
|-id=824 bgcolor=#fefefe
| 164824 ||  || — || September 9, 1999 || Socorro || LINEAR || — || align=right | 1.4 km || 
|-id=825 bgcolor=#E9E9E9
| 164825 ||  || — || September 8, 1999 || Socorro || LINEAR || EUN || align=right | 2.1 km || 
|-id=826 bgcolor=#E9E9E9
| 164826 ||  || — || September 8, 1999 || Socorro || LINEAR || — || align=right | 1.7 km || 
|-id=827 bgcolor=#fefefe
| 164827 ||  || — || September 8, 1999 || Catalina || CSS || — || align=right | 2.7 km || 
|-id=828 bgcolor=#E9E9E9
| 164828 ||  || — || October 5, 1999 || Catalina || CSS || — || align=right | 1.6 km || 
|-id=829 bgcolor=#E9E9E9
| 164829 ||  || — || October 3, 1999 || Kitt Peak || Spacewatch || — || align=right | 1.4 km || 
|-id=830 bgcolor=#E9E9E9
| 164830 ||  || — || October 4, 1999 || Kitt Peak || Spacewatch || — || align=right | 2.5 km || 
|-id=831 bgcolor=#fefefe
| 164831 ||  || — || October 5, 1999 || Kitt Peak || Spacewatch || NYS || align=right | 1.0 km || 
|-id=832 bgcolor=#E9E9E9
| 164832 ||  || — || October 6, 1999 || Kitt Peak || Spacewatch || — || align=right | 1.9 km || 
|-id=833 bgcolor=#E9E9E9
| 164833 ||  || — || October 7, 1999 || Kitt Peak || Spacewatch || — || align=right | 1.4 km || 
|-id=834 bgcolor=#fefefe
| 164834 ||  || — || October 8, 1999 || Kitt Peak || Spacewatch || — || align=right | 1.0 km || 
|-id=835 bgcolor=#E9E9E9
| 164835 ||  || — || October 8, 1999 || Kitt Peak || Spacewatch || — || align=right | 1.9 km || 
|-id=836 bgcolor=#E9E9E9
| 164836 ||  || — || October 10, 1999 || Kitt Peak || Spacewatch || — || align=right | 1.0 km || 
|-id=837 bgcolor=#E9E9E9
| 164837 ||  || — || October 12, 1999 || Kitt Peak || Spacewatch || — || align=right | 1.5 km || 
|-id=838 bgcolor=#E9E9E9
| 164838 ||  || — || October 12, 1999 || Kitt Peak || Spacewatch || — || align=right | 2.0 km || 
|-id=839 bgcolor=#fefefe
| 164839 ||  || — || October 15, 1999 || Kitt Peak || Spacewatch || MAS || align=right | 1.2 km || 
|-id=840 bgcolor=#E9E9E9
| 164840 ||  || — || October 15, 1999 || Socorro || LINEAR || — || align=right | 1.3 km || 
|-id=841 bgcolor=#fefefe
| 164841 ||  || — || October 4, 1999 || Socorro || LINEAR || — || align=right | 3.5 km || 
|-id=842 bgcolor=#fefefe
| 164842 ||  || — || October 6, 1999 || Socorro || LINEAR || — || align=right | 1.1 km || 
|-id=843 bgcolor=#d6d6d6
| 164843 ||  || — || October 6, 1999 || Socorro || LINEAR || SHU3:2 || align=right | 8.3 km || 
|-id=844 bgcolor=#d6d6d6
| 164844 ||  || — || October 7, 1999 || Socorro || LINEAR || HIL3:2 || align=right | 9.0 km || 
|-id=845 bgcolor=#fefefe
| 164845 ||  || — || October 7, 1999 || Socorro || LINEAR || NYS || align=right | 1.1 km || 
|-id=846 bgcolor=#E9E9E9
| 164846 ||  || — || October 7, 1999 || Socorro || LINEAR || — || align=right | 1.9 km || 
|-id=847 bgcolor=#fefefe
| 164847 ||  || — || October 7, 1999 || Socorro || LINEAR || H || align=right data-sort-value="0.95" | 950 m || 
|-id=848 bgcolor=#E9E9E9
| 164848 ||  || — || October 7, 1999 || Socorro || LINEAR || EUN || align=right | 1.9 km || 
|-id=849 bgcolor=#fefefe
| 164849 ||  || — || October 9, 1999 || Socorro || LINEAR || — || align=right | 1.5 km || 
|-id=850 bgcolor=#E9E9E9
| 164850 ||  || — || October 10, 1999 || Socorro || LINEAR || — || align=right | 1.9 km || 
|-id=851 bgcolor=#E9E9E9
| 164851 ||  || — || October 10, 1999 || Socorro || LINEAR || — || align=right | 1.2 km || 
|-id=852 bgcolor=#E9E9E9
| 164852 ||  || — || October 10, 1999 || Socorro || LINEAR || — || align=right | 3.7 km || 
|-id=853 bgcolor=#E9E9E9
| 164853 ||  || — || October 12, 1999 || Socorro || LINEAR || — || align=right | 3.1 km || 
|-id=854 bgcolor=#fefefe
| 164854 ||  || — || October 13, 1999 || Socorro || LINEAR || H || align=right data-sort-value="0.89" | 890 m || 
|-id=855 bgcolor=#E9E9E9
| 164855 ||  || — || October 13, 1999 || Socorro || LINEAR || — || align=right | 3.5 km || 
|-id=856 bgcolor=#E9E9E9
| 164856 ||  || — || October 14, 1999 || Socorro || LINEAR || EUN || align=right | 2.5 km || 
|-id=857 bgcolor=#E9E9E9
| 164857 ||  || — || October 15, 1999 || Socorro || LINEAR || — || align=right | 2.0 km || 
|-id=858 bgcolor=#d6d6d6
| 164858 ||  || — || October 15, 1999 || Socorro || LINEAR || SHU3:2 || align=right | 9.7 km || 
|-id=859 bgcolor=#fefefe
| 164859 ||  || — || October 15, 1999 || Socorro || LINEAR || — || align=right | 1.5 km || 
|-id=860 bgcolor=#E9E9E9
| 164860 ||  || — || October 4, 1999 || Catalina || CSS || — || align=right | 1.1 km || 
|-id=861 bgcolor=#E9E9E9
| 164861 ||  || — || October 10, 1999 || Socorro || LINEAR || — || align=right | 1.6 km || 
|-id=862 bgcolor=#E9E9E9
| 164862 ||  || — || October 13, 1999 || Socorro || LINEAR || — || align=right | 1.2 km || 
|-id=863 bgcolor=#E9E9E9
| 164863 ||  || — || October 3, 1999 || Socorro || LINEAR || ADE || align=right | 3.5 km || 
|-id=864 bgcolor=#E9E9E9
| 164864 ||  || — || October 3, 1999 || Socorro || LINEAR || BRG || align=right | 2.1 km || 
|-id=865 bgcolor=#fefefe
| 164865 ||  || — || October 3, 1999 || Socorro || LINEAR || H || align=right | 1.6 km || 
|-id=866 bgcolor=#E9E9E9
| 164866 ||  || — || October 6, 1999 || Socorro || LINEAR || — || align=right | 2.0 km || 
|-id=867 bgcolor=#fefefe
| 164867 ||  || — || October 10, 1999 || Socorro || LINEAR || H || align=right | 1.2 km || 
|-id=868 bgcolor=#fefefe
| 164868 ||  || — || October 3, 1999 || Kitt Peak || Spacewatch || — || align=right | 1.3 km || 
|-id=869 bgcolor=#E9E9E9
| 164869 ||  || — || October 31, 1999 || Bergisch Gladbach || W. Bickel || — || align=right | 1.6 km || 
|-id=870 bgcolor=#E9E9E9
| 164870 ||  || — || October 29, 1999 || Catalina || CSS || EUN || align=right | 2.0 km || 
|-id=871 bgcolor=#E9E9E9
| 164871 ||  || — || October 31, 1999 || Kitt Peak || Spacewatch || — || align=right | 1.4 km || 
|-id=872 bgcolor=#E9E9E9
| 164872 ||  || — || October 31, 1999 || Kitt Peak || Spacewatch || — || align=right | 1.6 km || 
|-id=873 bgcolor=#E9E9E9
| 164873 ||  || — || October 16, 1999 || Kitt Peak || Spacewatch || — || align=right | 1.2 km || 
|-id=874 bgcolor=#E9E9E9
| 164874 ||  || — || October 16, 1999 || Kitt Peak || Spacewatch || — || align=right | 2.3 km || 
|-id=875 bgcolor=#E9E9E9
| 164875 ||  || — || October 16, 1999 || Kitt Peak || Spacewatch || — || align=right | 1.4 km || 
|-id=876 bgcolor=#E9E9E9
| 164876 ||  || — || October 31, 1999 || Catalina || CSS || MAR || align=right | 1.6 km || 
|-id=877 bgcolor=#E9E9E9
| 164877 ||  || — || October 30, 1999 || Catalina || CSS || — || align=right | 2.1 km || 
|-id=878 bgcolor=#fefefe
| 164878 ||  || — || November 2, 1999 || Socorro || LINEAR || H || align=right | 1.2 km || 
|-id=879 bgcolor=#E9E9E9
| 164879 ||  || — || November 2, 1999 || Kitt Peak || Spacewatch || — || align=right data-sort-value="0.94" | 940 m || 
|-id=880 bgcolor=#E9E9E9
| 164880 ||  || — || November 3, 1999 || Socorro || LINEAR || — || align=right | 2.0 km || 
|-id=881 bgcolor=#E9E9E9
| 164881 ||  || — || November 3, 1999 || Socorro || LINEAR || — || align=right | 4.4 km || 
|-id=882 bgcolor=#E9E9E9
| 164882 ||  || — || November 4, 1999 || Kitt Peak || Spacewatch || — || align=right | 1.2 km || 
|-id=883 bgcolor=#E9E9E9
| 164883 ||  || — || November 4, 1999 || Socorro || LINEAR || — || align=right | 1.7 km || 
|-id=884 bgcolor=#E9E9E9
| 164884 ||  || — || November 5, 1999 || Kitt Peak || Spacewatch || — || align=right | 1.3 km || 
|-id=885 bgcolor=#E9E9E9
| 164885 ||  || — || November 4, 1999 || Socorro || LINEAR || — || align=right | 1.6 km || 
|-id=886 bgcolor=#E9E9E9
| 164886 ||  || — || November 5, 1999 || Socorro || LINEAR || — || align=right | 1.8 km || 
|-id=887 bgcolor=#E9E9E9
| 164887 ||  || — || November 6, 1999 || Kitt Peak || Spacewatch || — || align=right | 1.5 km || 
|-id=888 bgcolor=#E9E9E9
| 164888 ||  || — || November 5, 1999 || Socorro || LINEAR || — || align=right | 2.0 km || 
|-id=889 bgcolor=#E9E9E9
| 164889 ||  || — || November 9, 1999 || Socorro || LINEAR || — || align=right | 2.0 km || 
|-id=890 bgcolor=#E9E9E9
| 164890 ||  || — || November 9, 1999 || Socorro || LINEAR || — || align=right | 1.9 km || 
|-id=891 bgcolor=#E9E9E9
| 164891 ||  || — || November 9, 1999 || Socorro || LINEAR || — || align=right | 1.1 km || 
|-id=892 bgcolor=#E9E9E9
| 164892 ||  || — || November 9, 1999 || Socorro || LINEAR || — || align=right | 2.4 km || 
|-id=893 bgcolor=#E9E9E9
| 164893 ||  || — || November 9, 1999 || Socorro || LINEAR || — || align=right | 2.4 km || 
|-id=894 bgcolor=#E9E9E9
| 164894 ||  || — || November 9, 1999 || Socorro || LINEAR || — || align=right | 1.5 km || 
|-id=895 bgcolor=#E9E9E9
| 164895 ||  || — || November 9, 1999 || Socorro || LINEAR || — || align=right | 1.3 km || 
|-id=896 bgcolor=#E9E9E9
| 164896 ||  || — || November 4, 1999 || Kitt Peak || Spacewatch || — || align=right | 2.1 km || 
|-id=897 bgcolor=#E9E9E9
| 164897 ||  || — || November 10, 1999 || Kitt Peak || Spacewatch || — || align=right | 2.0 km || 
|-id=898 bgcolor=#fefefe
| 164898 ||  || — || November 14, 1999 || Socorro || LINEAR || — || align=right | 1.9 km || 
|-id=899 bgcolor=#E9E9E9
| 164899 ||  || — || November 14, 1999 || Socorro || LINEAR || — || align=right | 1.3 km || 
|-id=900 bgcolor=#fefefe
| 164900 ||  || — || November 9, 1999 || Socorro || LINEAR || H || align=right data-sort-value="0.75" | 750 m || 
|}

164901–165000 

|-bgcolor=#E9E9E9
| 164901 ||  || — || November 9, 1999 || Socorro || LINEAR || — || align=right | 2.2 km || 
|-id=902 bgcolor=#E9E9E9
| 164902 ||  || — || November 15, 1999 || Socorro || LINEAR || — || align=right | 1.5 km || 
|-id=903 bgcolor=#d6d6d6
| 164903 ||  || — || November 5, 1999 || Socorro || LINEAR || HIL3:2 || align=right | 8.2 km || 
|-id=904 bgcolor=#E9E9E9
| 164904 ||  || — || November 26, 1999 || Višnjan Observatory || K. Korlević || — || align=right | 2.0 km || 
|-id=905 bgcolor=#E9E9E9
| 164905 ||  || — || November 30, 1999 || Oizumi || T. Kobayashi || — || align=right | 2.8 km || 
|-id=906 bgcolor=#E9E9E9
| 164906 ||  || — || November 29, 1999 || Kitt Peak || Spacewatch || — || align=right | 1.4 km || 
|-id=907 bgcolor=#fefefe
| 164907 ||  || — || November 30, 1999 || Kitt Peak || Spacewatch || H || align=right | 1.1 km || 
|-id=908 bgcolor=#E9E9E9
| 164908 ||  || — || December 4, 1999 || Catalina || CSS || — || align=right | 2.1 km || 
|-id=909 bgcolor=#fefefe
| 164909 ||  || — || December 4, 1999 || Catalina || CSS || — || align=right | 1.4 km || 
|-id=910 bgcolor=#E9E9E9
| 164910 ||  || — || December 5, 1999 || Catalina || CSS || — || align=right | 2.1 km || 
|-id=911 bgcolor=#E9E9E9
| 164911 ||  || — || December 5, 1999 || Socorro || LINEAR || — || align=right | 4.3 km || 
|-id=912 bgcolor=#E9E9E9
| 164912 ||  || — || December 5, 1999 || Višnjan Observatory || K. Korlević || — || align=right | 1.3 km || 
|-id=913 bgcolor=#E9E9E9
| 164913 ||  || — || December 6, 1999 || Socorro || LINEAR || MIT || align=right | 4.9 km || 
|-id=914 bgcolor=#E9E9E9
| 164914 ||  || — || December 7, 1999 || Dynic || A. Sugie || — || align=right | 1.6 km || 
|-id=915 bgcolor=#E9E9E9
| 164915 ||  || — || December 6, 1999 || Gnosca || S. Sposetti || — || align=right | 2.0 km || 
|-id=916 bgcolor=#E9E9E9
| 164916 ||  || — || December 5, 1999 || Socorro || LINEAR || — || align=right | 2.0 km || 
|-id=917 bgcolor=#E9E9E9
| 164917 ||  || — || December 7, 1999 || Socorro || LINEAR || — || align=right | 1.7 km || 
|-id=918 bgcolor=#E9E9E9
| 164918 ||  || — || December 7, 1999 || Socorro || LINEAR || — || align=right | 1.7 km || 
|-id=919 bgcolor=#E9E9E9
| 164919 ||  || — || December 7, 1999 || Socorro || LINEAR || — || align=right | 2.5 km || 
|-id=920 bgcolor=#E9E9E9
| 164920 ||  || — || December 7, 1999 || Socorro || LINEAR || — || align=right | 1.6 km || 
|-id=921 bgcolor=#E9E9E9
| 164921 ||  || — || December 7, 1999 || Socorro || LINEAR || — || align=right | 1.8 km || 
|-id=922 bgcolor=#E9E9E9
| 164922 ||  || — || December 7, 1999 || Socorro || LINEAR || RAF || align=right | 2.2 km || 
|-id=923 bgcolor=#E9E9E9
| 164923 ||  || — || December 7, 1999 || Socorro || LINEAR || — || align=right | 3.4 km || 
|-id=924 bgcolor=#E9E9E9
| 164924 ||  || — || December 7, 1999 || Socorro || LINEAR || — || align=right | 1.8 km || 
|-id=925 bgcolor=#E9E9E9
| 164925 ||  || — || December 7, 1999 || Socorro || LINEAR || — || align=right | 3.4 km || 
|-id=926 bgcolor=#E9E9E9
| 164926 ||  || — || December 7, 1999 || Socorro || LINEAR || — || align=right | 2.5 km || 
|-id=927 bgcolor=#E9E9E9
| 164927 ||  || — || December 7, 1999 || Socorro || LINEAR || MRX || align=right | 2.1 km || 
|-id=928 bgcolor=#E9E9E9
| 164928 ||  || — || December 7, 1999 || Socorro || LINEAR || EUN || align=right | 2.4 km || 
|-id=929 bgcolor=#E9E9E9
| 164929 ||  || — || December 7, 1999 || Socorro || LINEAR || — || align=right | 2.2 km || 
|-id=930 bgcolor=#E9E9E9
| 164930 ||  || — || December 7, 1999 || Socorro || LINEAR || — || align=right | 1.6 km || 
|-id=931 bgcolor=#E9E9E9
| 164931 ||  || — || December 11, 1999 || Socorro || LINEAR || — || align=right | 1.8 km || 
|-id=932 bgcolor=#fefefe
| 164932 ||  || — || December 5, 1999 || Catalina || CSS || — || align=right | 2.4 km || 
|-id=933 bgcolor=#E9E9E9
| 164933 ||  || — || December 7, 1999 || Catalina || CSS || — || align=right | 1.6 km || 
|-id=934 bgcolor=#E9E9E9
| 164934 ||  || — || December 7, 1999 || Catalina || CSS || — || align=right | 2.2 km || 
|-id=935 bgcolor=#E9E9E9
| 164935 ||  || — || December 7, 1999 || Catalina || CSS || — || align=right | 2.2 km || 
|-id=936 bgcolor=#E9E9E9
| 164936 ||  || — || December 12, 1999 || Socorro || LINEAR || — || align=right | 6.0 km || 
|-id=937 bgcolor=#E9E9E9
| 164937 ||  || — || December 7, 1999 || Kitt Peak || Spacewatch || — || align=right | 1.6 km || 
|-id=938 bgcolor=#E9E9E9
| 164938 ||  || — || December 7, 1999 || Kitt Peak || Spacewatch || — || align=right | 4.8 km || 
|-id=939 bgcolor=#E9E9E9
| 164939 ||  || — || December 8, 1999 || Socorro || LINEAR || — || align=right | 2.2 km || 
|-id=940 bgcolor=#E9E9E9
| 164940 ||  || — || December 8, 1999 || Socorro || LINEAR || — || align=right | 1.8 km || 
|-id=941 bgcolor=#E9E9E9
| 164941 ||  || — || December 10, 1999 || Socorro || LINEAR || — || align=right | 3.5 km || 
|-id=942 bgcolor=#E9E9E9
| 164942 ||  || — || December 10, 1999 || Socorro || LINEAR || — || align=right | 2.5 km || 
|-id=943 bgcolor=#E9E9E9
| 164943 ||  || — || December 10, 1999 || Socorro || LINEAR || — || align=right | 2.3 km || 
|-id=944 bgcolor=#E9E9E9
| 164944 ||  || — || December 10, 1999 || Socorro || LINEAR || — || align=right | 2.2 km || 
|-id=945 bgcolor=#E9E9E9
| 164945 ||  || — || December 12, 1999 || Socorro || LINEAR || — || align=right | 1.9 km || 
|-id=946 bgcolor=#E9E9E9
| 164946 ||  || — || December 12, 1999 || Socorro || LINEAR || — || align=right | 3.4 km || 
|-id=947 bgcolor=#E9E9E9
| 164947 ||  || — || December 12, 1999 || Socorro || LINEAR || — || align=right | 2.2 km || 
|-id=948 bgcolor=#E9E9E9
| 164948 ||  || — || December 7, 1999 || Catalina || CSS || — || align=right | 1.6 km || 
|-id=949 bgcolor=#E9E9E9
| 164949 ||  || — || December 7, 1999 || Catalina || CSS || — || align=right | 3.9 km || 
|-id=950 bgcolor=#E9E9E9
| 164950 ||  || — || December 4, 1999 || Anderson Mesa || LONEOS || — || align=right | 3.1 km || 
|-id=951 bgcolor=#E9E9E9
| 164951 ||  || — || December 13, 1999 || Socorro || LINEAR || — || align=right | 3.6 km || 
|-id=952 bgcolor=#E9E9E9
| 164952 ||  || — || December 3, 1999 || Anderson Mesa || LONEOS || JUN || align=right | 3.5 km || 
|-id=953 bgcolor=#E9E9E9
| 164953 ||  || — || December 12, 1999 || Kitt Peak || Spacewatch || — || align=right | 1.2 km || 
|-id=954 bgcolor=#E9E9E9
| 164954 ||  || — || December 19, 1999 || Socorro || LINEAR || BRU || align=right | 7.1 km || 
|-id=955 bgcolor=#E9E9E9
| 164955 ||  || — || December 27, 1999 || Kitt Peak || Spacewatch || — || align=right | 1.7 km || 
|-id=956 bgcolor=#E9E9E9
| 164956 ||  || — || December 27, 1999 || Kitt Peak || Spacewatch || — || align=right | 2.6 km || 
|-id=957 bgcolor=#E9E9E9
| 164957 ||  || — || December 31, 1999 || Anderson Mesa || LONEOS || — || align=right | 2.3 km || 
|-id=958 bgcolor=#E9E9E9
| 164958 ||  || — || January 2, 2000 || Socorro || LINEAR || — || align=right | 1.6 km || 
|-id=959 bgcolor=#E9E9E9
| 164959 ||  || — || January 2, 2000 || Socorro || LINEAR || — || align=right | 2.4 km || 
|-id=960 bgcolor=#E9E9E9
| 164960 ||  || — || January 3, 2000 || Socorro || LINEAR || — || align=right | 2.2 km || 
|-id=961 bgcolor=#E9E9E9
| 164961 ||  || — || January 3, 2000 || Socorro || LINEAR || — || align=right | 2.2 km || 
|-id=962 bgcolor=#E9E9E9
| 164962 ||  || — || January 3, 2000 || Socorro || LINEAR || — || align=right | 2.4 km || 
|-id=963 bgcolor=#E9E9E9
| 164963 ||  || — || January 3, 2000 || Socorro || LINEAR || — || align=right | 3.4 km || 
|-id=964 bgcolor=#E9E9E9
| 164964 ||  || — || January 3, 2000 || Socorro || LINEAR || — || align=right | 1.7 km || 
|-id=965 bgcolor=#E9E9E9
| 164965 ||  || — || January 3, 2000 || Socorro || LINEAR || — || align=right | 2.6 km || 
|-id=966 bgcolor=#E9E9E9
| 164966 ||  || — || January 5, 2000 || Kitt Peak || Spacewatch || — || align=right | 3.5 km || 
|-id=967 bgcolor=#fefefe
| 164967 ||  || — || January 4, 2000 || Socorro || LINEAR || V || align=right | 1.8 km || 
|-id=968 bgcolor=#fefefe
| 164968 ||  || — || January 4, 2000 || Socorro || LINEAR || — || align=right | 2.1 km || 
|-id=969 bgcolor=#E9E9E9
| 164969 ||  || — || January 4, 2000 || Socorro || LINEAR || — || align=right | 2.8 km || 
|-id=970 bgcolor=#E9E9E9
| 164970 ||  || — || January 4, 2000 || Socorro || LINEAR || — || align=right | 3.1 km || 
|-id=971 bgcolor=#E9E9E9
| 164971 ||  || — || January 4, 2000 || Socorro || LINEAR || — || align=right | 3.4 km || 
|-id=972 bgcolor=#E9E9E9
| 164972 ||  || — || January 4, 2000 || Socorro || LINEAR || — || align=right | 3.6 km || 
|-id=973 bgcolor=#E9E9E9
| 164973 ||  || — || January 5, 2000 || Socorro || LINEAR || — || align=right | 2.3 km || 
|-id=974 bgcolor=#E9E9E9
| 164974 ||  || — || January 5, 2000 || Socorro || LINEAR || — || align=right | 2.2 km || 
|-id=975 bgcolor=#E9E9E9
| 164975 ||  || — || January 5, 2000 || Socorro || LINEAR || — || align=right | 3.1 km || 
|-id=976 bgcolor=#E9E9E9
| 164976 ||  || — || January 5, 2000 || Socorro || LINEAR || — || align=right | 2.2 km || 
|-id=977 bgcolor=#E9E9E9
| 164977 ||  || — || January 5, 2000 || Socorro || LINEAR || — || align=right | 3.0 km || 
|-id=978 bgcolor=#E9E9E9
| 164978 ||  || — || January 5, 2000 || Socorro || LINEAR || — || align=right | 6.3 km || 
|-id=979 bgcolor=#fefefe
| 164979 ||  || — || January 8, 2000 || Socorro || LINEAR || H || align=right | 1.0 km || 
|-id=980 bgcolor=#E9E9E9
| 164980 ||  || — || January 8, 2000 || Socorro || LINEAR || GAL || align=right | 3.9 km || 
|-id=981 bgcolor=#E9E9E9
| 164981 ||  || — || January 8, 2000 || Socorro || LINEAR || — || align=right | 2.9 km || 
|-id=982 bgcolor=#E9E9E9
| 164982 ||  || — || January 7, 2000 || Socorro || LINEAR || — || align=right | 1.8 km || 
|-id=983 bgcolor=#E9E9E9
| 164983 ||  || — || January 7, 2000 || Socorro || LINEAR || — || align=right | 3.2 km || 
|-id=984 bgcolor=#E9E9E9
| 164984 ||  || — || January 8, 2000 || Socorro || LINEAR || — || align=right | 3.1 km || 
|-id=985 bgcolor=#E9E9E9
| 164985 ||  || — || January 3, 2000 || Kitt Peak || Spacewatch || — || align=right | 3.7 km || 
|-id=986 bgcolor=#E9E9E9
| 164986 ||  || — || January 8, 2000 || Kitt Peak || Spacewatch || — || align=right | 1.9 km || 
|-id=987 bgcolor=#E9E9E9
| 164987 ||  || — || January 5, 2000 || Socorro || LINEAR || — || align=right | 1.3 km || 
|-id=988 bgcolor=#E9E9E9
| 164988 ||  || — || January 6, 2000 || Socorro || LINEAR || — || align=right | 3.3 km || 
|-id=989 bgcolor=#E9E9E9
| 164989 ||  || — || January 2, 2000 || Socorro || LINEAR || HNS || align=right | 2.4 km || 
|-id=990 bgcolor=#E9E9E9
| 164990 ||  || — || January 27, 2000 || Kitt Peak || Spacewatch || AGN || align=right | 1.7 km || 
|-id=991 bgcolor=#E9E9E9
| 164991 ||  || — || January 29, 2000 || Socorro || LINEAR || — || align=right | 3.6 km || 
|-id=992 bgcolor=#E9E9E9
| 164992 ||  || — || January 29, 2000 || Socorro || LINEAR || — || align=right | 3.7 km || 
|-id=993 bgcolor=#E9E9E9
| 164993 ||  || — || January 26, 2000 || Kitt Peak || Spacewatch || AST || align=right | 2.9 km || 
|-id=994 bgcolor=#E9E9E9
| 164994 ||  || — || January 29, 2000 || Kitt Peak || Spacewatch || — || align=right | 2.7 km || 
|-id=995 bgcolor=#E9E9E9
| 164995 ||  || — || January 30, 2000 || Socorro || LINEAR || ADE || align=right | 4.5 km || 
|-id=996 bgcolor=#E9E9E9
| 164996 ||  || — || January 30, 2000 || Socorro || LINEAR || — || align=right | 2.4 km || 
|-id=997 bgcolor=#E9E9E9
| 164997 ||  || — || January 29, 2000 || Socorro || LINEAR || — || align=right | 2.3 km || 
|-id=998 bgcolor=#E9E9E9
| 164998 ||  || — || January 30, 2000 || Socorro || LINEAR || — || align=right | 2.5 km || 
|-id=999 bgcolor=#E9E9E9
| 164999 ||  || — || January 30, 2000 || Socorro || LINEAR || — || align=right | 3.9 km || 
|-id=000 bgcolor=#E9E9E9
| 165000 ||  || — || January 27, 2000 || Kitt Peak || Spacewatch || GEF || align=right | 2.1 km || 
|}

References

External links 
 Discovery Circumstances: Numbered Minor Planets (160001)–(165000) (IAU Minor Planet Center)

0164